= List of colonial governors of the Gambia =

Governor of the Gambia
- Gambia Colony and Protectorate
- Style: His Excellency
- Member of: Executive Council, Legislative Council
- Reports to: Secretary of State for the Colonies
- Formation: 1843, 1901
- First holder: Henry Froude Seagram
- Final holder: John Paul
- Abolished: 1866, 1965
- Deputy: Colonial Secretary of the Gambia

This is a list of colonial governors and administrators in the Gambia from the establishment of a British settlement on St Mary's Island, now known as Banjul Island, in 1816, through to the Gambia Colony and Protectorate's independence from the United Kingdom in 1965.

The official title of the Commandant of St Mary's Island was given as the Commandant of the British Settlement at St Mary's in 1823. In 1821, the Gambia became a British colony that formed part of Sierra Leone. In 1829, a lieutenant governor was appointed that was subordinate to the governor of Sierra Leone. Between 1843 and 1866, the Gambia had its own governor independent of Sierra Leone. It once again became subordinate in 1866, with an administrator being appointed to govern the territory. An independent governor was again appointed in 1901 that also acted as the commander-in-chief of the colony.

The Gambia achieved independence in 1965. Thereafter, the viceroy of the British Crown in the Gambia became the Governor-General of the Gambia, until it renounced Queen Elizabeth II as head of state in 1970.

== Before 1816 ==
Before 1816, the colonial presence in the Gambia was restricted to James Island (known as St Andrew's Island from 1456 to 1660, and as Kunta Kinteh Island since 2011).

== Commandants of St Mary's Island (1816–1830) ==
Commandant	Term of office		Prior or concurrent offices	Colonial Secretary	Monarch	Ref
Lieutenant Colonel; Sir Alexander Grant (1775–1827)	23 April 1816	1 August 1826	– Officer with the Royal African Corps (1804–1825) – Acting Governor of Sierra Leone (1820–1821; 1821)	None	George III (1760–1820)	
Lieutenant Colonel; Sir Alexander Grant (1775–1827)	First British colonial administrator in the Gambia since 1783. Negotiated lease of St Mary's Island in 1816. Founded town of Bathurst. Encouraged activities of Wesleyans and Quakers. Subordinated to Sierra Leone in 1821. Purchased MacCarthy Island in 1823 and founded Georgetown. Acquired Ceded Mile from the king of Barra in 1826.				George IV (1820–1830)	
Colonel; Alexander Findlay(1784–1851)	1 August 1826	8 March 1829	– Officer with the Royal African Corps	None	George IV (1820–1830)	
Colonel; Alexander Findlay(1784–1851)	Appointed an advisory board of commerce.				George IV (1820–1830)	
William Hutton^{α} (17??–18??)	8 March 1829	8 August 1829	– Acting Consul for the Kingdom of Ashanti	None	George IV (1820–1830)	
William Hutton^{α} (17??–18??)	Assumed role after Findlay returned to Britain. Initiated merchant-backed April 1829 expedition down the Gambia River. Signed treaties with the king of Wuli and chief of Kantalikunda, later rescinded. Dismissed for misconduct.				George IV (1820–1830)	
Captain; James Jackson^{α} (17??–18??)	8 August 1829	28 January 1830	– Officer with the 3rd West India Regiment	None	George IV (1820–1830)	
Captain; James Jackson^{α} (17??–18??)	Took over from Hutton. Signed secret treaty with the king of Kombo regarding return of fugitive slaves. Treaty later repudiated by Colonies Secretary.				George IV (1820–1830)	

== Lieutenant Governors of the Gambia (1830–1843) ==
Lieutenant Governor	Term of office		Prior or concurrent offices	Colonial Secretary	Monarch	Ref
Colonel; Alexander Findlay (1784–1851)	28 January 1830	3 April 1830	– Officer with the Royal African Corps – Commandant of St Mary's Island (1826–1829)	None	George IV (1820–1830)	
Colonel; Alexander Findlay (1784–1851)	Almost immediately appointed as Lieutenant Governor of Sierra Leone.				George IV (1820–1830)	
George Rendall (d. 1837)	3 April 1830	20 September 1837	– Chief Justice of Sierra Leone (1829–1830)	Andrew Hunter	George IV (1820–1830)	
George Rendall (d. 1837)	Established a Liberated Africans Department in 1831. 1831–32 Barra War, also known as the Anglo-Niumi War. Groundnuts shipped to Britain for the first time in 1834. Failed expedition against Kemintang Kamara in 1835. Died of yellow fever in office.				William IV (1830–1837)	
George Rendall (d. 1837)	Established a Liberated Africans Department in 1831. 1831–32 Barra War, also known as the Anglo-Niumi War. Groundnuts shipped to Britain for the first time in 1834. Failed expedition against Kemintang Kamara in 1835. Died of yellow fever in office.				Victoria (1837–1901)	
Anthony Clogstoun^{α} (1815–1851)	20 September 1837	October; 1838	– Writer in the Colonial Secretary's Office	Thomas Lewis Ingram	Victoria (1837–1901)	
Anthony Clogstoun^{α} (1815–1851)	Assumed role immediately after Rendall's death in office.				Victoria (1837–1901)	
Major; Sir William Mackie (d. 1839)	October; 1838	17 September 1839	– Officer with the 88th Regiment of Foot	Thomas Lewis Ingram	Victoria (1837–1901)	
Major; Sir William Mackie (d. 1839)	Died in office.				Victoria (1837–1901)	
Thomas Lewis Ingram^{α} (1807–1868)	17 September 1839	10 April 1840	– Colonial Secretary of the Gambia (1837–1849)	Himself	Victoria (1837–1901)	
Thomas Lewis Ingram^{α} (1807–1868)	Then-Acting Colonial Secretary. Appointed Acting Lieutenant Governor despite objections of Bathurst merchants.				Victoria (1837–1901)	
Captain; Sir Henry Vere Huntley (1795–1864)	10 April 1840	31 May 1841	– Captain of HMS Lynx	Thomas Lewis Ingram	Victoria (1837–1901)	
Captain; Sir Henry Vere Huntley (1795–1864)	Agreed cession of part of Kombo from king of Kombo in 1840, creating British Kombo. Left in May 1841.				Victoria (1837–1901)	
Thomas Lewis Ingram^{α} (1807–1868)	31 May 1841	1 April 1843	– Colonial Secretary of the Gambia (1837–1849)	Himself	Victoria (1837–1901)	
Thomas Lewis Ingram^{α} (1807–1868)	Re-appointed after Huntley left the Gambia.				Victoria (1837–1901)	

== Governors of the Gambia (1843–1866) ==
Governor	Term of office		Prior or concurrent offices	Colonial Secretary	Monarch	Ref
Henry Froude Seagram (1802–1843)	1 April 1843	26 August 1843	– Unknown	Thomas Lewis Ingram	Victoria (1837–1901)	
Henry Froude Seagram (1802–1843)	First Governor as a distinct colony. Almost immediately appointed as Lieutenant Governor of Sierra Leone.				Victoria (1837–1901)	
Thomas Lewis Ingram^{α} (1807–1868)	26 August 1843	7 August 1844	– Colonial Secretary of the Gambia (1837–1849)	Himself	Victoria (1837–1901)	
Thomas Lewis Ingram^{α} (1807–1868)	Established a Liberated Africans Department in 1831. Failed expedition against Kemintang Kamara in 1835. Died of yellow fever in office.				Victoria (1837–1901)	
Edmund Nash Norcott (1794–1874)	30 October 1843	15 March 1844	– Unknown	Thomas Lewis Ingram	Victoria (1837–1901)	
Edmund Nash Norcott (1794–1874)	Did not take office.				Victoria (1837–1901)	
Sir John Iles Mantell^{α} (1813–1893)	7 August 1844	9 December 1844	– Queen's Advocate in the Gambia (1841–1847)	Himself	Victoria (1837–1901)	
Sir John Iles Mantell^{α} (1813–1893)	Acting Governor while serving as Queen's Advocate.				Victoria (1837–1901)	
Captain; Charles Fitzgerald (1791–1887)	9 December 1844	18 April 1847	– Unknown	Thomas Lewis Ingram	Victoria (1837–1901)	
Captain; Charles Fitzgerald (1791–1887)	Agreed cession of part of Kombo from king of Kombo, creating British Kombo. Left in May 1841.				Victoria (1837–1901)	
Thomas Lewis Ingram^{α} (1807–1868)	18 April 1847	21 December 1847	– Colonial Secretary of the Gambia (1837–1849)	Himself	Victoria (1837–1901)	
Thomas Lewis Ingram^{α} (1807–1868)	Re-appointed after Fitzgerald left the Gambia.				Victoria (1837–1901)	
Richard Graves MacDonnell (1814–1881)	21 December 1847	18 August 1852	– Chief Justice of the Gambia (1843–1847)	Thomas Lewis Ingram	Victoria (1837–1901)	
Daniel Robertson^{α} (1813–1892)	11 August 1851	12 March 1852	– Colonial Secretary of the Gambia (1849–1865)	Himself	Victoria (1837–1901)	
Daniel Robertson^{α} (1813–1892)	Brief period as Acting Governor in place of MacDonnell.				Victoria (1837–1901)	
Arthur Kennedy (1809–1883)	May; 1852	May; 1852	– Poor Law Commission administrator (1846–1851)	Daniel Robertson	Victoria (1837–1901)	
Arthur Kennedy (1809–1883)	Before formally taking up role, was re-appointed to Governor of Sierra Leone, so never entered office.				Victoria (1837–1901)	
Daniel Robertson^{α} (1813–1892)	18 August 1852	21 October 1852	– Colonial Secretary of the Gambia (1849–1865)	Himself	Victoria (1837–1901)	
Daniel Robertson^{α} (1813–1892)	Appointed Acting Governor after MacDonnell left the Gambia, and after Kennedy did not take up role.				Victoria (1837–1901)	
Lieutenant Colonel; Luke Smythe O'Connor (1806–1873)	21 October 1852	23 April 1859	– Officer with the 1st West India Regiment	Daniel Robertson	Victoria (1837–1901)	
Lieutenant Colonel; Luke Smythe O'Connor (1806–1873)	Upper Kombo ceded to the British by the king of Kombo in 1853. Commanded British soldiers at both sackings of Sabbajee. Negotiated end to Soninke-Marabout War (1850–1856). Albreda ceded by the French to the British in 1857.				Victoria (1837–1901)	
Daniel Robertson^{α} (1813–1883)	23 April 1859	6 September 1859	– Colonial Secretary of the Gambia (1849–1865)	Himself	Victoria (1837–1901)	
George Abbas Kooli D'Arcy (1818–1885)	6 September 1859	19 February 1866	– Officer with the 3rd West India Regiment	Daniel Robertson	Victoria (1837–1901)	
George Abbas Kooli D'Arcy (1818–1885)	Ma Bah begins attacks on the Soninke at Baddibu in 1862. Death of Maba Diakhou Bâ at the Battle of Fandane-Thiouthioune in 1867.				Victoria (1837–1901)	

== Administrators of the Gambia (1866–1901) ==
Administrator	Term of office		Prior or concurrent offices	Colonial Secretary	Monarch	Ref
George Abbas Kooli D'Arcy (1818–1885)	19 February 1866	18 December 1866	– Officer with the 3rd West India Regiment – Governor of the Gambia (1859–1866)	Unknown	Victoria (1837–1901)	
Rear Admiral; Charles George Edward Patey (1811–1881)	18 December 1866	21 April 1869	– Administrator of Lagos (1866)		Victoria (1837–1901)	
Major; Alexander Bravo^{α} (18??–18??)	21 April 1869	12 September 1870	– Unknown		Victoria (1837–1901)	
Major; Alexander Bravo^{α} (18??–18??)	Acting Administrator during a major cholera outbreak in 1869. British government accepts proposals on cession to France in principle. Native petitions and opposition in the House of Commons leads to the abandonment of the proposal.				Victoria (1837–1901)	
Lieutenant Colonel; Henry Anton^{α} (1824–1871)	12 September 1870	7 August 1871	– Acting Administrator.		Victoria (1837–1901)	
Thomas F. Callaghan (1827–1881)	7 August 1871	21 April 1872	– Governor of Labuan (1861–1866)		Victoria (1837–1901)	
Henry William John Fowler^{α} (1842–1893)	21 April 1872	7 October 1872	– Acting Administrator.		Victoria (1837–1901)	
Captain; Henry T. M. Cooper^{α} (1838–1877)	7 October 1872	2 October 1873	– Unknown		Victoria (1837–1901)	
Cornelius Hendricksen Kortright (1817–1897)	2 October 1873	12 February 1875	– Lieutenant Governor of Tobago (1864–1872)		Victoria (1837–1901)	
Captain; Henry T. M. Cooper^{α} (1838–1877)	12 February 1875	2 July 1875	– Unknown		Victoria (1837–1901)	
Brigade Surgeon; Samuel Rowe (retd) (1835–1888)	2 July 1875	3 July 1875	– Colonial Surgeon of the Gold Coast (1875) – Governor of Sierra Leone (1875–1881)		Victoria (1837–1901)	
Brigade Surgeon; Samuel Rowe (retd) (1835–1888)	Day after arrival, was re-assigned as Acting Governor of Sierra Leone.				Victoria (1837–1901)	
Captain; Henry T. M. Cooper^{α} (1838–1877)	3 July 1875	9 January 1877	– Unknown		Victoria (1837–1901)	
Captain; Henry T. M. Cooper^{α} (1838–1877)	Tomani Bojang, last Soninke king of Kombo, surrenders to Fodi Silla. British government proposes cession to France again, but abandons the idea in 1876. Died in office.				Victoria (1837–1901)	
William Hamilton Berkeley^{α} (18??–18??)	9 January 1877	30 March 1877	– Unknown		Victoria (1837–1901)	
William Hamilton Berkeley^{α} (18??–18??)	Acting Administrator until the arrival of Gouldsbury.				Victoria (1837–1901)	
Surgeon Lieutenant Colonel; Valesius Skipton Gouldsbury; CMG (1839–1896)	30 March 1877	3 March 1884	– Civil Commandant at Accra		Victoria (1837–1901)	
Surgeon Lieutenant Colonel; Valesius Skipton Gouldsbury; CMG (1839–1896)	Civil war in Baddibu begins in 1877. First issue of The Bathurst Observer and West African Gazette in 1883. J. D. Richards appointed as first African member of the Legislative Council in 1883.				Victoria (1837–1901)	
Cornelius Alfred Moloney (1848–1913)	3 March 1884	December; 1885	– Colonial Secretary of Lagos (1879–1884)		Victoria (1837–1901)	
Gilbert Thomas Carter^{α} (1848–1927)	December; 1885	8 February 1886	– Treasurer and Postmaster of the Gambia (1882–1888)		Victoria (1837–1901)	
James Shaw Hay (1839–1924)	8 February 1886	12 June 1886	– Unknown		Victoria (1837–1901)	
Gilbert Thomas Carter^{α} (1848–1927)	12 June 1886	29 April 1887	– Treasurer and Postmaster of the Gambia (1882–1888)		Victoria (1837–1901)	
Gilbert Thomas Carter^{α} (1848–1927)	From 1886 to December 1888, Carter was the Acting Administrator.				Victoria (1837–1901)	
Brigade Surgeon; Samuel Rowe (retd) (1835–1888)	29 April 1887	27 November 1887	– Governor of British West Africa (1885–1888)		Victoria (1837–1901)	
Brigade Surgeon; Samuel Rowe (retd) (1835–1888)	Effectively acting in this role from Sierra Leone.				Victoria (1837–1901)	
Thomas Risely Griffith^{α} (1848–1???)	27 November 1887	6 June 1888	– Unknown – Governor of Sierra Leone (1875–1881)		Victoria (1837–1901)	
Thomas Risely Griffith^{α} (1848–1???)	Acting Administrator from 6 June 1888 to 29 November 1888.				Victoria (1837–1901)	
Gilbert Thomas Carter (1848–1927)	6 June 1888	2 March 1891	– Treasurer and Postmaster of the Gambia (1882–1888)		Victoria (1837–1901)	
Gilbert Thomas Carter (1848–1927)	Acting Administrator from 6 June 1888 to 29 November 1888. The Gambia becomes separate colony for the last time in 1888 as administrative link with Sierra Leone is severed. Anglo-French agreement in 1889 fixes border of The Gambia.				Victoria (1837–1901)	
Charles Herbert Harley Moseley^{α} (1857–1933)	16 March 1891	19 April 1891	– Unknown		Victoria (1837–1901)	
Robert Baxter Llewelyn (1845–1919)	19 April 1891	21 March 1900	– Commissioner of Saint Lucia (1889–1891)		Victoria (1837–1901)	
Robert Baxter Llewelyn (1845–1919)	Fodi Kabba driven into Casamance by British forces in 1892. First Travelling Commissioners, J. H. Ozanne and C. F. Sitwell, appointed in 1893. First comprehensive ordnance for governing the colony in 1894.				Victoria (1837–1901)	
Horace Major Brandford Griffith^{α} (1863–1909)	21 March 1900	10 January 1901	– Unknown		Victoria (1837–1901)	
Horace Major Brandford Griffith^{α} (1863–1909)	Killing of Travelling Commissioners Sitwell and Silva in June 1900.				Victoria (1837–1901)	
Sir George Chardin Denton (1851–1928)	10 January 1901	4 March 1901	– Lieutenant Governor of Lagos (1900)		Victoria (1837–1901)	
Sir George Chardin Denton (1851–1928)	Upgraded to Governor in March 1901.				Edward VII (1901–1910)	

== Governors of the Gambia (1901–1965) ==
Governor	Term of office		Prior or concurrent offices	Colonial Secretary	Monarch	Ref
Sir George Chardin Denton (1851–1928)	11 January 1901	21 December 1911	– Administrator of the Gambia (1901)	Charles O'Brien	Edward VII (1901–1910)	
Sir George Chardin Denton (1851–1928)	Death of Fodi Kabba in 1901. Establishment of the Gambia Company in 1901. Expedition of parasitologist Joseph Everett Dutton. S. J. Forster appointed as permanent member of the Legislative Council for the first time in 1906, dies in 1940.				George V (1910–1936)	
Lieutenant Colonel; Sir Henry Galway (1859–1949)	21 December 1911	30 January 1914	– Governor of Saint Helena (1903–1911)	Charles O'Brien	George V (1910–1936)	
Lieutenant Colonel; Sir Henry Galway (1859–1949)	Ordnance for governing the protectorate revised in 1913.				George V (1910–1936)	
Cecil Gwyn^{α} (18??–19??)	30 January 1914	10 April 1914	– Unknown		George V (1910–1936)	
Sir Edward John Cameron (1858–1947)	11 April 1914	July; 1920	– Commissioner of Saint Lucia (1909–1914)		George V (1910–1936)	
Sir Edward John Cameron (1858–1947)	Governor during World War I. Establishment of the Gambia Section of the National Congress of British West Africa in 1920.				George V (1910–1936)	
Herbert Henniker-Heaton^{α} (1880–1961)	1920	1921	– Lieutenant Governor of Tobago (1864–1872)		George V (1910–1936)	
Sir Cecil Hamilton Armitage (1869–1833)	3 January 1921	10 March 1927	– Chief Commissioner of the Northern Territories of the Gold Coast (1910–1920)	Charles R. M. Workman	George V (1910–1936)	
Sir Cecil Hamilton Armitage (1869–1833)	Demonetization of the French franc in 1922. Ousman Jeng appointed to the Legislative Council representing the Muslims of Bathurst in 1922. First issue of The Gambia Outlook and Senegambian Reporter, published by Edward Francis Small, in 1922. Opening of the Armitage School in 1927.				George V (1910–1936)	
Sir John Middleton (1870–1954)	10 March 1927	October; 1928	– Governor of the Falkland Islands (1920–1927)	Charles R. M. Workman	George V (1910–1936)	
Charles Rufus Marshall Workman^{α} (1874–1942)	October; 1928	29 November 1928	– Unknown		George V (1910–1936)	
Charles Rufus Marshall Workman^{α} (1874–1942)	Acting Governor between Middleton's departure and Denham's arrival.				George V (1910–1936)	
Sir Edward Brandis Denham (1876–1938)	29 November 1928	13 January 1930	– Colonial Secretary of Kenya (1923–1928)	Charles R. M. Workman	George V (1910–1936)	
Sir Edward Brandis Denham (1876–1938)	Bathurst Trade Union formed in 1929. BTU organises successful strike the same year. Denham leaves shortly afterwards having found it difficult to cope.				George V (1910–1936)	
Charles Rufus Marshall Workman^{α} (1874–1942)	13 January 1930	11 September 1930	– Unknown		George V (1910–1936)	
Charles Rufus Marshall Workman^{α} (1874–1942)	Acting Governor between Denham's departure and Palmer's arrival.				George V (1910–1936)	
Sir Richmond Palmer (1877–1958)	11 September 1930	12 April 1933	– Governor of Northern Nigeria (1925–1930)	Charles R. M. Workman; Godfrey Charles Brian Parish	George V (1910–1936)	
Sir Richmond Palmer (1877–1958)	Bathurst Urban District Council (BUDC) formed in 1930. Sheikh Omar Fye appointed as Muslim member of the Legislative Council in 1932, replacing Jeng. He serves until 1947. BTU becomes first registered trade union in Africa. A general reorganization of government takes place in 1933.				George V (1910–1936)	
Godfrey Charles Brian Parishh^{α} (1897–1934)	12 April 1933	April; 1934	– Unknown	Himself	George V (1910–1936)	
Godfrey Charles Brian Parishh^{α} (1897–1934)	Acting Governor between the departure of Palmer and the arrival of Richards.				George V (1910–1936)	
Sir Arthur Richards (1885–1978)	April; 1934	30 May 1936	– Governor of North Borneo (1930–1934)		George V (1910–1936)	
Sir Arthur Richards (1885–1978)	Establishment of the Bathurst Advisory Town Council (BATC) in 1935, replacing the BUDC.				Edward VIII (1936)	
Harris Rendell Oke^{α} (1891–1940)	30 May 1936	22 October 1936	– Unknown	Himself	Edward VIII (1936)	
Harris Rendell Oke^{α} (1891–1940)	Acting Governor between Richards' departure and Southorn's arrival.				Edward VIII (1936)	
Sir Thomas Southorn (1879–1957)	22 October 1936	23 March 1942	– Colonial Secretary of Hong Kong (1925–1936)	Kenneth Blackburne	Edward VIII (1936)	
Sir Thomas Southorn (1879–1957)	Governor during home front build-up in early World War II.				George VI (1936–1952)	
Sir Hilary Blood (1893–1967)	23 March 1942	October; 1946	– Colonial Secretary of Sierra Leone (1934–1942)	Kenneth Blackburne; George D. Chamberlain	George VI (1936–1952)	
Sir Hilary Blood (1893–1967)	Governor during the deployment of Gambia Regiment soldiers to Burma in 1944 and 1945. Drew up plans on how the Colonial Development and Welfare Acts funds were to be spent. Modernized the Bathurst water system, established a sewage system, paved streets, and improved the port. Established the Bathurst Town Council in 1946. Drew up 1947 Constitution that created direct elections.				George VI (1936–1952)	
George D. Chamberlain^{α} (1???–19??)	October; 1946	29 March 1947	– Unknown	Himself	George VI (1936–1952)	
George D. Chamberlain^{α} (1???–19??)	Acting Governor between Blood's departure and Wright's arrival.				George VI (1936–1952)	
Lieutenant Colonel; Sir Andrew Barkworth Wright (1895–1971)	29 March 1947	May; 1949	– Colonial Secretary of the Windward Islands (1943–1947)		George VI (1936–1952)	
Lieutenant Colonel; Sir Andrew Barkworth Wright (1895–1971)	Yundum egg scheme failure. Organised first direct election to Legislative Council of Edward Francis Small in 1947. Began policy of Africanization of the civil service and the reduction of European privilege. Departure to Cyprus led to protests due to his popularity.				George VI (1936–1952)	
Edward Rex Ward^{α} (1902–19??)	May; 1949	December; 1949	– Unknown	Himself	George VI (1936–1952)	
Edward Rex Ward^{α} (1902–19??)	Acting Governor between Wright's departure and Wyn-Harris' arrival.				George VI (1936–1952)	
Sir Percy Wyn-Harris (1903–1979)	December; 1949	9 April 1958	– Chief Native Commissioner of Kenya (1947–1949)		George VI (1936–1952)	
Sir Percy Wyn-Harris (1903–1979)	Opposed broadly to the development of self-government. Expanded elected and unofficial places on the Executive and Legislative Councils. I.M. Garba-Jahumpa founds the Gambia Muslim Congress in 1952. Dismissal of Pierre Sarr N'Jie from the Executive Council. Wyn-Harris is unpopular among Colony, but popular among Protectorate due to efforts to improve conditions there. Forced to leave role incognito across the Senegal border.				Elizabeth II (1952–1970)^{β}	
Alexander Nicol Anton Waddell^{α} (1913–1999)	9 April 1958	19 June 1958	– Unknown	Himself	Elizabeth II (1952–1970)^{β}	
Alexander Nicol Anton Waddell^{α} (1913–1999)	Acting Governor between Wyn-Harris' departure and Windley's arrival.				Elizabeth II (1952–1970)^{β}	
Sir Edward Henry Windley (1909–1972)	19 June 1958	29 March 1962	– Chief Native Commissioner of Kenya (1953–1958)		Elizabeth II (1952–1970)^{β}	
Sir Edward Henry Windley (1909–1972)	Drew up 1959 Constitution which established the House of Representatives. Foundation of the People's Progressive Party in 1959. Explored possibility of union with Senegal. Gambia Workers' Union carries out successful general strike in 1960. Drew up 1961 Constitution that led to full self-government. Appointed Pierre Sarr N'Jie as Chief Minister in 1961.				Elizabeth II (1952–1970)^{β}	
Kenneth Graeme Stewart Smith^{α} (1918–2001)	28 February 1962	29 March 1962	– Unknown	Himself	Elizabeth II (1952–1970)^{β}	
Kenneth Graeme Stewart Smith^{α} (1918–2001)	Acting Governor between Windley's departure and Paul's arrival.				Elizabeth II (1952–1970)^{β}	
Captain; Sir John Paul (1916–2004)	29 March 1962	18 February 1965	– Secretary to the Cabinet of Sierra Leone (1960–1962)		Elizabeth II (1952–1970)^{β}	
Captain; Sir John Paul (1916–2004)	Appointed Dawda Jawara as Prime Minister in 1962 following the 1962 election. First major census of the Gambia in 1963. Independence conference in London in 1964, post-independence agreements reached with Senegal. Independence from the UK on 18 February 1965, Paul becomes first Governor-General.				Elizabeth II (1952–1970)^{β}	

== See also ==
- History of the Gambia
- List of heads of state of the Gambia
- List of heads of government of the Gambia
- Lists of office-holders

== Notes ==
^α This incumbent was acting in this position in the place of a formally-appointed incumbent.
^β Elizabeth II remained as monarch of The Gambia from 1965 to 1970 in her capacity as Queen of the Gambia.
