= Colonial Secretary of the Gambia =

Colonial Government of Gambia Colony

- Gambia Colony and Protectorate
- Member of: Executive Council, Legislative Council
- Reports to: Governor of the Gambia
- Formation: 1831
- First holder: Andrew Hunter
- Abolished: 1965

The Colonial Secretary of the Gambia was a key role in the colonial government of the Gambia Colony and Protectorate. Often seen as the deputy to the governor or colonial administrator, Colonial Secretaries often stepped in as acting governors through the Gambia's colonial history. The Colonial Secretary was in charge of administration, and was often a career Colonial Office official.

== Role ==
In the British Empire, Colonial Secretaries served as the chief administrative officers of the colonies to which they were posted. They were responsible for conducting the business of the Governor with the various Government Departments and also with the colonists, collectively and individually. The Colonial Secretary was a member of both the Executive and Legislative Councils. Often, Colonial Secretaries became responsible for a variety of functions, including customs, post offices, shipping, harbours, prisons, and natives. The Colonial Secretary often also dealt directly with England. The role was often quite flexible depending on the Governor, as the Colonial Office was reluctant to define the role precisely, fearing it would become redundant.

== List of colonial secretaries ==
No.	Name	Governor served	Took office	Left office	Ref.
1	Andrew Hunter		1831	1837	
2	Thomas Lewis Ingram		1837	1849	
3	Daniel Robertson		1849	c. 1865	
4	Charles O'Brien		1910	1912	
5	Herbert Henniker-Heaton		1917	1921	
6	Charles Rufus Marshall Workman		1921	1931	
7	Godfrey C. B. Parish		1931	1934	
8	Captain Harris R. Oke		1934	1941	
9	Sir Kenneth Blackburne		1941	1943	
10	George D. Chamberlain		1943	1947	
11	Edward R. Ward		1947	1952	
12	Sir Alexander N. A. Waddell		1952	1956	
13	Kenneth G. S. Smith		1956	1962	
