= Jeremiah Thomas Fitzgerald Callaghan =

British colonial governor

Jeremiah Thomas Fitzgerald Callaghan CMG (27 December 1827 – 9 July 1881), often T(homas) F(itzgerald) Callaghan, was an Irish-born colonial administrator who served as Governor of the British colonies of Labuan, the Falkland Islands, and the Bahamas, and Administrator of The Gambia.

== Biography ==
Callaghan was born on 27 December 1827 in the town of Midleton in County Cork, Ireland. His father was a woolen draper.

Callaghan arrived in Hong Kong on 25 November 1860, and was gazetted as its Chief Magistrate the following day. H.T. Davies, the previous Chief Magistrate, stated that Callaghan broke down "under the responsibility of the peculiar and intricate duties which encountered him". The following July he sailed for the Crown Colony of Labuan, to become its governor.

Callaghan was instructed to maintain friendly relations with Sarawak, which was ruled by White Rajah James Brooke, however opposed colonial status for Sarawak, because "it suffered from want of population and cultivation", and proposed that mass Chinese immigration would rectify this within two centuries.

In 1866, sickness forced him to return to England, where he married Alice Arnold, the daughter of George Matthews Arnold, an eight-time Mayor of Gravesend.

In May 1871, he was appointed Administrator of The Gambia, and arrived there in August of that year, however sickness again forced an early departure in April 1872.

From 1876 to 1880, he served as Governor of the Falkland Islands. He was made a Companion of the Order of St Michael and St George in mid-1877.

He arrived in the Bahamas in February 1881, but departed for England within a few months again due to sickness. On a stopover in New York, however, he died.

Government offices
Preceded by George Warren Edwardes	Governor of Labuan; 1861–1866	Succeeded by Hugh Low (acting)
Preceded by Alexander Bravo	Administrator of The Gambia; 1871–1872	Succeeded by Cornelius Hendricksen Kortright
Preceded by Colonel George Abbas Kooli D'Arcy	Governor of the Falkland Islands; 1876-1880	Succeeded by Thomas Kerr
Preceded by Sir William Robinson	Governor of the Bahamas; 1881	Succeeded by Sir Charles Cameron Lees
