= Joe Ansbro =

Scotland international rugby union player

- Born: Joe Ansbro; 29 October 1985 (age 41) Glasgow, Scotland
- Height: 1.83 m (6 ft 0 in)
- Weight: 96 kg (15 st 2 lb)
- School: Stonyhurst College
- University: Cambridge University

Rugby union career
- Position: Centre
Youth career
- 2003–2007: Northampton Saints
Senior career
Years	Team	Apps	(Points)
2007–2011	Northampton Saints	53	(53)
2011–2013	London Irish	15	(15)
- Correct as of 4 November 2009
International career
Years	Team	Apps	(Points)
2010–2013	Scotland	11	(15)
- Correct as of 15 May 2013

Joe Ansbro (Born Glasgow, 29 October 1985) is a former Scottish international professional rugby union player. He is the first player of African origin to represent Scotland at test level in history. His favoured position is centre. He most recently played for London Irish. After gaining 11 full international caps his rugby career ended due to serious neck injury at the age of 26.

== Early years ==
Ansbro was born in Glasgow and raised near Gatehouse of Fleet in the historic county of Kirkcudbrightshire in the administrative area of Dumfries & Galloway, Scotland. He was educated at Gatehouse Primary School before at the age of eight years entering St Mary's Hall, the preparatory school for Stonyhurst College. He played youth rugby with Stewartry Sharks, the youth team of Stewartry RFC. His senior education was received at Stonyhurst College before embarking on study of a Natural Sciences degree at Robinson College, Cambridge.

== Northampton ==
Ansbro joined the Northampton Academy in 2006, during this time he was part of the Cambridge University side that took part in The Varsity Match, producing some quality displays for the University. Northampton Saints took notice of this and he became a regular in the number 13 shirt during their season in National Division One, he also scored in the EDF Energy Trophy final.

== London Irish ==
Ansbro joined London Irish in 2011 on a three-year deal. The Scotland centre was one of numerous international players to join the club in 2011. London Irish head coach Toby Booth said: "He's quick, powerful with a great future ahead and will fit in nicely." Ansbro commented that "there are some great players who have committed their long term futures to the club and that speaks volumes for what is happening there."

== Scotland ==
Ansbro made his international debut for Scotland A during the 2009 IRB Nations Cup tournament in Romania. Scotland A eventually went on to win the tournament, with Ansbro making his debut as outside centre in the win against Uruguay. He made his first senior Scotland appearance in the 21–17 victory over reigning world champions South Africa in doing so he became the first black player to represent Scotland at test level. A week later he played in the 19–16 win against Samoa at Pittodrie in Aberdeen.

Ansbro made his 6 nations appearance in Scotland's opening match of the 2011 Six Nations Championship against France in Paris. Ansbro and the rest of the Scotland team put in an impressive performance against a clinical French side despite eventually losing the match 34–21.

His first points for Scotland came in the 10–6 victory in a 2011 Rugby World Cup warm-up game against Ireland where he scored the winning try in the 76th minute. Ansbro was included in Scotland's 30 man squad for the 2011 Rugby World Cup in New Zealand. He went on to score his first RWC try against Romania in Scotland's first group game of the 2011 tournament. The number 13 jersey in the next two games was taken by Nick de Luca before Ansbro was again selected, this time in Scotland's final group game versus England.

== Injury ==
Ansbro broke his neck in a pre-season friendly against Munster on 24 August 2012. After being taken to hospital straight after the match it was discovered that Ansbro had a triple fracture of the C1 vertebra. As of 15 May 2013 Ansbro officially retired from rugby union.

== Teaching ==
Ansbro, having graduated from Cambridge University before his professional career became a Biology teacher and rugby coach at Harrow School, the public school.

== See also ==
- James Robertson (rugby union, born 1854) - the first known black rugby union player. He played for Royal HSFP and Edinburgh District in the early 1870s.
- Alfred Clunies-Ross - the first non-white rugby union international player. He was capped by Scotland in the very first international match in 1871. Clunies-Ross was half-Malayan; a Cocos Malay. The Clunies-Ross family were Scots from the Cocos (Keeling) Islands; a previously uninhabited set of islands which they colonised along with Malayan workers.
- Andrew Watson (footballer, born 1856) - the first black person to play association football. Watson played for Maxwell, Parkgrove, and Queens Park before being capped for Scotland national football team.
