= Henry Anton =

British colonial administrator (1824–1871)

Henry Anton (1824 - 1 August 1871) was a British Army officer and colonial administrator. He served as the Acting Administrator of the Gambia from September 1870 to August 1871.

== Military and colonial service ==
Anton was an officer with the 1st West India Regiment. He joined at the rank of Ensign in 1842, and was promoted to Lieutenant in 1843. He was promoted to Captain in 1854, and by 1856 was commanding troops in Port Royal, Jamaica. Anton was an officer involved in the Baddibu War of 1860–1861, against the Kingdom of Baddibu, a native kingdom of the Gambia. He was subsequently promoted to Major, and commanded detachments of the regiment during the Second Ashanti War in 1863.

Anton was present and commanded troops in Jamaica in 1865 during the Morant Bay rebellion. In August 1866, Anton commanded four companies that left Jamaica and went back to the west coast of Africa. He was placed in charge of the West India Regiment soldiers in The Gambia. On 8 June 1867, Anton was promoted to Lieutenant Colonel. He was appointed as Acting Administrator of the Gambia on 12 September 1870, succeeding Major Alexander Bravo. During his brief tenure, a third petition of Gambians against cession to France was submitted to London, a census of the colony was conducted, and the publication of The Bathurst Times, the first Gambian newspaper, began. In May, Thomas F. Callaghan was appointed as substantive administrator, and in August Anton died on his return journey to England of dysentery.

There is a memorial to him at Church of All Saints in Haugham, Lincolnshire.

Government offices
Preceded by Alexander Bravo	Administrator of the Gambia; 1870–1871	Succeeded by Thomas F. Callaghan
