= Alexander Findlay (British Army officer) =

Alexander Findlay, KH (c. 1784 – 9 May 1851) was a British Army officer and colonial governor.

== Military service ==
Findlay served in a Highland regiment during the Napoleonic Wars as a private soldier. He transferred to the 2nd West India Regiment following the war, becoming a Lieutenant in 1816, a Captain in 1821, and a Major in 1826. Findlay first arrived in Africa in 1819, and was appointed to succeed Alexander Grant as Commandant of St Mary's Island in August 1826, as the latter retired due to poor health. In 1826, Findlay appointed an advisory board of commerce. Among the appointees was Charles Grant, a British merchant who was the cousin of Alexander.

Findlay returned to England in March 1829 as a Lieutenant Colonel, but returned in December that year as the first Lieutenant Governor of the Gambia. However, he was quickly promoted to Lieutenant Governor of Sierra Leone and so left the Gambia in April 1830. He served in Sierra Leone until April 1833, when he was recalled following his controversial imprisonment of Hamilton Edmund MacCormac. He later served as Fort Major of Fort George, Scotland. In 1838, Findlay wrote to the Secretary of State for the Colonies, applying for the vacant role of Lieutenant Governor in the Gambia, but the application was rejected.

Government offices
New creation	Lieutenant Governor of the Gambia; 1829–1830	Succeeded by George Rendall
Preceded by Alexander Maclean Fraser (acting)	Lieutenant Governor of Sierra Leone; 1830–1833	Succeeded by Michael Linning Melville (acting)
