= Valesius Skipton Gouldsbury =

British surgeon and colonial administrator

Valesius Skipton Gouldsbury CMG

Administrator of Saint Lucia
- In office 2 April 1891 – 11 November 1896
- Monarch: Victoria
- Preceded by: Robert Baxter Llewelyn
- Succeeded by: Charles King-Harman

Administrator of the Gambia
- In office 30 March 1877 – March 1884
- Monarch: Victoria
- Preceded by: Samuel Rowe
- Succeeded by: Cornelius Alfred Moloney

Personal details
- Born: 17 March 1839 Dublin, Ireland, United Kingdom
- Died: 11 November 1896 (aged 57) London, England
- Education: Queen's College, Dublin

Military service
- Branch/service: British Army
- Years of service: 1863–1885
- Rank: Brigadier Surgeon
- Unit: Army Medical Service

Valesius Skipton Gouldsbury CMG (17 March 1839 – 11 November 1896) was a British surgeon, military officer, and colonial administrator. He served as Administrator of the Gambia from 1877 to 1884, and Administrator of Saint Lucia from 1891 to 1896.

== Early life and education ==
Gouldsbury was born in Dublin, Ireland, in 1839. He studied at the Ledwich School of Medicine, and became a Licentiate of Medicine at Coombe Hospital in 1857. In 1862, he graduated with a doctorate in medicine without honours from the Queen's University of Ireland, and was admitted as a member of the Royal College of Surgeons of England in the same year.

== Military career ==
Gouldsbury was appointed as a Staff Assistant Surgeon on 30 September 1863. He served in the Anglo-Ashante Wars in the Gold Coast from 1873 to 1874 and was presented with a sword by the Secretary of State for the Colonies for his conduct. He was promoted to Surgeon Major in 1876 and was placed in charge of the Salafa Expedition in that same year. He was promoted to Surgeon Lieutenant-Colonel in 1883, and placed on retirement pay with the rank of Brigade Surgeon in 1885.

== Colonial service ==
Before serving in the Gambia, Gouldsbury was Civil Commandant at Accra.

Gouldsbury was assigned as Administrator of the Gambia in 1877. He was a controversial administrator, and his policies were criticised by the Gambia Native Association. Among his achievements was appointing J.D. Richards to the Legislative Council in 1883, being the first African member. Gouldsbury led an expedition into the Gambia in 1881, as far as Futa Jallon, to investigate trade opportunities. He also established friendly relations with a number of rulers, and signed a number of treaties. Gouldsbury's negative report of trade prospects confirmed a feeling in London that further expansion into the interior would cost more than it gained. Gouldsbury left the Gambia in March 1884.

He was appointed as Administrator of Saint Lucia on 2 April 1891. He was also appointed as Acting Governor of the Windward Islands on the same date, in the absence of a Governor. He served in Saint Lucia until 1896.

== Death ==
Gouldsbury suffered from failing health in Saint Lucia, and left in 1896 to return to England in an attempt to recover. He died in London on 11 November 1896.
