= Governor Darling =

Governor Darling may refer to:

- Charles Henry Darling (1809–1870), 3rd Governor of Victoria from 1863 to 1866
- Clifford Darling (1922–2011), 4th Governor-General of the Bahamas from 1992 to 1995
- Henry Darling (1780–1845), Lieutenant Governor of Tobago from 1833 to 1845
- Ralph Darling, (1772–1858), Governor of New South Wales from 1825 to 1831
