= Governor Robertson =

Governor Robertson may refer to:

- Daniel Robertson (colonial administrator) (1813–1892), Acting Governor of the Gambia in 1859 and 1861
- James B. A. Robertson (1871–1938), 4th Governor of Oklahoma
- James Robertson (British Army officer) (1717–1788), 40th British Governor of New York from 1779 to 1783
- James Wilson Robertson (1899–1983), 2nd Governor-General of Nigeria from 1955 to 1960
- Thomas B. Robertson (1779–1828), 3rd Governor of Louisiana
- William Charles Fleming Robertson (1867–1937), Governor of Barbados from 1925 to 1932
- Wyndham Robertson (1803–1888), Acting Governor of Virginia from 1836 to 1837
