= James O'Grady =

British politician and colonial administrator (1866–1934)

Sir James O'Grady KCMG
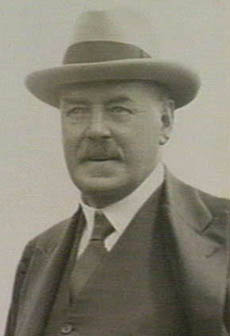

14th Governor of Tasmania
- In office 23 December 1924 – 23 December 1930
- Monarch: George V
- Premier: Joseph Lyons; John McPhee
- Preceded by: Sir William Allardyce
- Succeeded by: Sir Ernest Clark

17th Governor of the Falkland Islands
- In office 1931–1934
- Monarch: George V
- Preceded by: Sir Arnold Hodson
- Succeeded by: Sir Herbert Henniker-Heaton

Member of Parliament for Leeds South East
- In office 14 December 1918 – 29 October 1924
- Preceded by: Constituency Created
- Succeeded by: Henry Slesser

Member of Parliament for Leeds East
- In office 8 February 1906 – 14 December 1918
- Preceded by: Henry Struther Cautley
- Succeeded by: Constituency Abolished

Personal details
- Born: 6 May 1866 Bristol, England
- Died: 10 December 1934 (aged 68) London, England
- Party: Labour

Sir James O'Grady, KCMG (6 May 1866 – 10 December 1934) was a trade unionist and Labour Party politician in the United Kingdom. He was the first colonial governor appointed by the Labour Party from within its own ranks.

== Early life ==
O'Grady was born in Bristol to Irish parents. His father was a labourer, and after leaving school at ten, O'Grady did various lowly jobs, before training as a cabinet-maker, and became active in the Amalgamated Union of Cabinetmakers.

== Political career ==
O'Grady (second from right) in 1906, with other leading figures in the party

A member of the Independent Labour Party and supported by the Labour Representation Committee, he was elected at the 1906 general election as Member of Parliament (MP) for Leeds East. He had benefited from the Gladstone–MacDonald pact negotiated between Herbert Gladstone and Ramsay MacDonald, and faced only a Unionist opponent, whom he defeated by a wide margin.

O'Grady was re-elected at the elections in January 1910 and December 1910 elections, and when the Leeds East constituency was abolished for the 1918 general election, he was returned unopposed for the new Leeds South East constituency. He held that seat until he stepped down from Parliament at the 1924 general election.

In the House of Commons, he spoke frequently, particularly on foreign affairs, and was noted as a strong supporter of the First World War, speaking at recruitment rallies. He was also Labour's only Roman Catholic MP.

Through his role in the Amalgamated Union of Cabinet Makers, he had been President of the Trades Union Congress in 1898, and he continued his union activities whilst an MP. After a variety of posts in unions related to the furniture trades, he became general secretary of the National Federation of General Workers in 1918.

== Governorships ==
In 1924, Ramsay MacDonald's First Labour Government offered O'Grady the post of British Ambassador to the Soviet Union, and he accepted. He was a logical choice because he had successfully negotiated an exchange of prisoners in 1919 and had been involved in international trade union-led efforts to relieve the Russian famine in 1921, but O'Grady did not in the end get the job, because the government postponed exchanging ambassadors.

Instead O'Grady became Governor of Tasmania from 1924 to 1930. The first Labour politician to be appointed as a colonial governor by a Labour government. His appointment was resisted by the Australian Labor Party, which wanted the job to go to an Australian.

O'Grady was knighted as a Knight Commander of the Order of St Michael and St George and moved to Tasmania, taking office on 23 December. His governorship was marked by conflicts with the Legislative Council (which urged to do more to promote economic development), and his governor's reports were outspoken, but he appears to have parted on good terms.

O'Grady's next appointment was in 1931, as Governor of the Falkland Islands, but he retired in 1934 due to ill-health. He died later that year, aged 68.

== Notes ==
Parliament of the United Kingdom
Preceded by Henry Cautley	Member of Parliament for Leeds East; 1906–1918	Constituency abolished
New constituency	Member of Parliament for Leeds South East; 1918–1924	Succeeded by Henry Slesser
Trade union offices
Preceded by J. V. Stevens	President of the Trades Union Congress; 1898	Succeeded by W. J. Vernon
Preceded by Matthew Arrandale and Enoch Edwards	Trades Union Congress representative to the American Federation of Labour; 1903; With: William Mullin	Succeeded by William Abraham and James Wignall
Preceded by Allan Gee	Chairman of the General Federation of Trade Unions; 1912–1918	Succeeded by Joseph Cross
Preceded by New position	President of the International Federation of Factory Workers; 1920–1925	Succeeded by August Brey
Government offices
Preceded by Sir William Allardyce	Governor of Tasmania; 1924–1930	Succeeded by Sir Ernest Clark
Preceded by Sir Arnold Weinholt Hodson	Governor of the Falkland Islands; 1931–1934	Succeeded by Sir Herbert Henniker-Heaton
