= Governor Armitage =

Governor Armitage may refer to:

- Cecil Hamilton Armitage (1869–1933), Governor of the Gambia from 1921 to 1927
- Robert Perceval Armitage (1906–1990), Governor of Cyprus from 1954 to 1955 and Governor of Nyasaland from 1956 to 1961
