= Crown Colony of Sarawak =

British colony in Asia from 1946 to 1963

Crown Colony of Sarawak (1946–1963) State of Sarawak (1963)
- 1946–1963
- Flags: Top (1947–1963); Bottom (1963) Coat of arms (1947–1963)
- Anthem: "God Save the King" (1946–1952); "God Save the Queen" (1952–1963) "Fair Land Sarawak" (1946–1963)
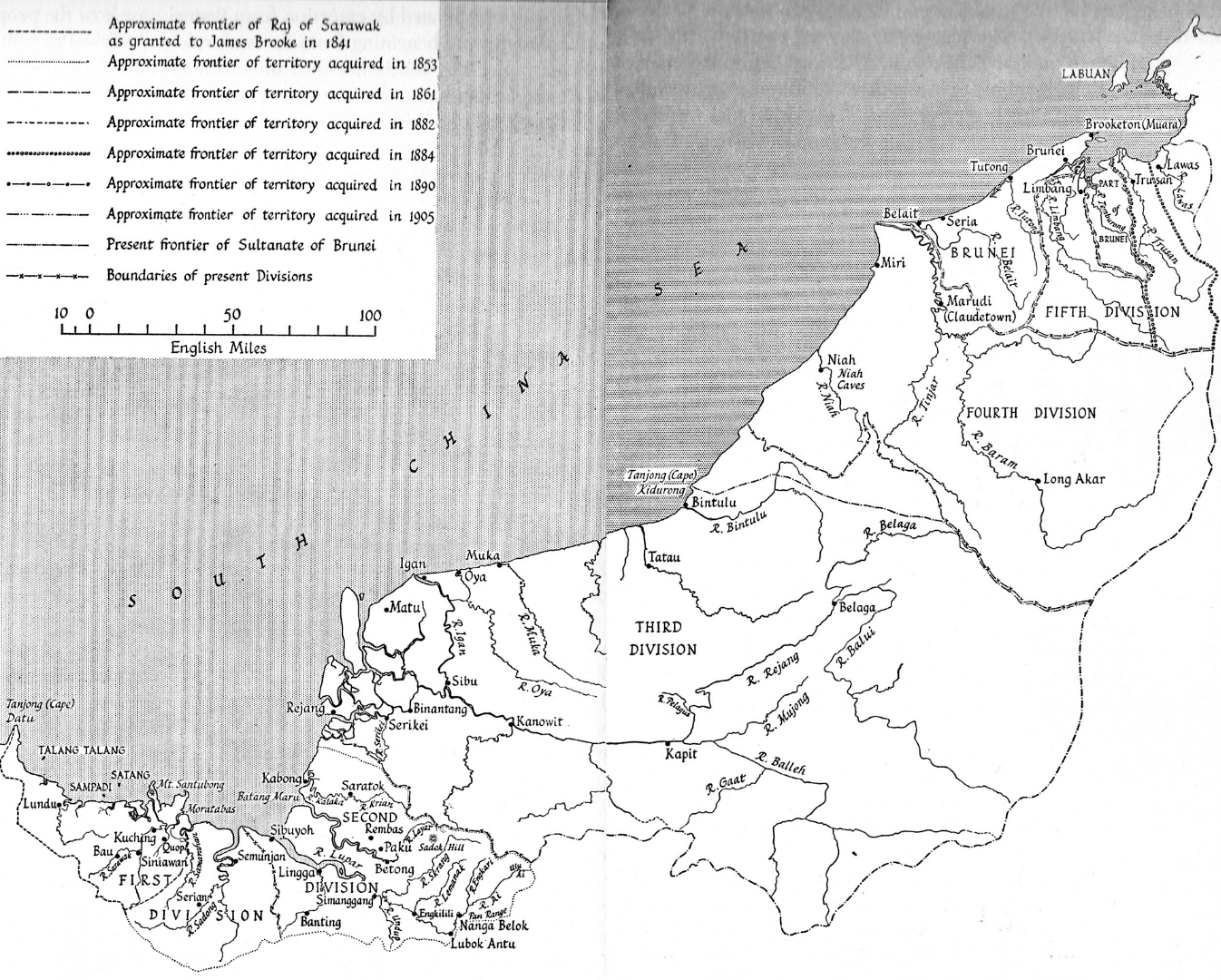
- Status: British Colony
- Capital: Kuching
- Common languages: English, Iban, Melanau, Bidayuh, Sarawak Malay, Chinese etc.
- Monarch
  - 1946–1952: George VI
  - 1952–1963: Elizabeth II
- Governor
  - 1946–1949: Charles Clarke
  - 1960–1963: Alexander Waddell
- Legislature: Council Negri
- Historical era: Post-war • Cold War
  - Sarawak ceded to the Crown Colony: 1 July 1946
  - Self-government: 22 July 1963
  - Malaysia Agreement: 16 September 1963
- Currency: Sarawak dollar, later Malaya and British Borneo dollar
Preceded by	Succeeded by
British Military Administration (Borneo)	Malaysia; Sarawak
- Today part of: Malaysia

The Crown Colony of Sarawak was a British Crown colony on the island of Borneo, established in 1946, shortly after the dissolution of the British Military Administration. It was succeeded as the state of Sarawak through the formation of the Federation of Malaysia on 16 September 1963.

== History ==
=== Cession ===
After the end of the Japanese occupation of Sarawak on 11 September 1945, the British Military Administration put John Fitzpatrick in control of Sarawak before handing it back to Rajah Charles Vyner Brooke seven months later on 15 April 1946. Charles Vyner Brooke arrived in Sarawak on 15 April 1946 to receive the handover. He was generally well received by the Sarawak population. During the Japanese occupation, Sarawak had suffered a total loss of 23 million dollars (excluding 57 million in losses by Sarawak oil company) due to the destruction of oilfields, airstrips, and rubber plantations. Vyner Brooke found that he did not have enough resources to develop Sarawak. He also didn't have a male heir to inherit the position of White Rajah and did not have confidence in the abilities of his brother Bertram Brooke and Bertram's son Anthony Brooke to govern Sarawak. Vyner Brooke hoped that with the cession of Sarawak as a British Crown colony, the British would be able to rebuild Sarawak's infrastructure and develop its postwar economy. The news of the cession of Sarawak came to light on 8 February 1946; there was a mixed response from the Sarawak people. The Iban, Chinese, and Melanau communities received the news positively. However, the majority of Malays were against the cession of Sarawak to the British government. British representatives conducted a survey among the ethnic groups in Sarawak regarding the cession issue. On 10 May 1946, a report was compiled and sent to the Colonial Office in London, which included the following:

... there was sufficient acquiescent or favourable opinion in the country as a whole to justify the question of cession being brought before the Council Negri of Sarawak, and they strongly urged that there should be no postponement of that action.

According to ABC Radio Melbourne, Rajah Charles Vyner Brooke would receive £1 million as compensation for the cession of Sarawak. This gave an impression that Vyner was trying to sell Sarawak for personal gain – in contrast to the 1941 constitution of Sarawak which stated that Sarawak would head towards self-governance under Brooke's guidance. The constitution was not implemented due to the Japanese occupation. The proposed cession was also criticised by a local Malay newspaper, Utusan Sarawak, as the British had failed to protect Sarawak from Japanese invasion in 1942, only to try to claim Sarawak after the war. In addition, the British would only approve financial loans to rebuild Sarawak upon Sarawak's cession as a Crown colony. The British claim on Sarawak was therefore seen as an effort to exploit the natural resources of Sarawak for their own economic interests. On top of this, the British Colonial Office had also tried to combine British Malaya, the Straits Settlements, British North Borneo, Brunei, and Sarawak into one administrative unit. From 1870 until 1917, the British had tried to interfere with the internal affairs of Sarawak, but this was met with stiff resistance from Rajah Charles Brooke. The British also tried to interfere with the succession issue of Anthony Brooke in 1940, and in 1941 had urged Vyner Brooke to sign an agreement to station a British advisor in Sarawak for fear of Japanese influence in Southeast Asia. The British also became wary that Australia intended to take over the military administration of Sarawak. Consequently, the British government wished to take control of Sarawak before the Australians did. The British were in a dire financial situation after the war and would require the resources from Sarawak to rebuild its post-war economy and repay war loans. On 6 February 1946, the official explanation for annexation of Sarawak was given by British House of Commons, stated that the British would require additional obligations to discharge its duties under the 1888 protectorate agreement for Sarawak, 1941 agreement on the obligation to act on British representative advice on defence, foreign affairs, and status of foreign nationals, and the UN Charter.

From 15 to 17 May 1946, the cession bill was debated in the Council Negri (now Sarawak State Legislative Assembly) and was approved by 19 to 16 votes. European officers were generally supportive of the cession, but the Malay officials strongly opposed the cession. About 300 to 400 Malay civil servants resigned from their posts in protest. Questions had been raised about the legality of such voting in Council Negri. Outsiders such as European officers took part in the voting that decided the fate of Sarawak. Several Chinese representatives were threatened with their lives if they did not vote to support the cession. The cession bill was signed on 18 May 1946 by Rajah Charles Vyner Brooke and the British representative, C.W. Dawson, at the Astana, Kuching; the cession of Sarawak as a British Crown colony became effective on 1 July 1946. On the same day, Rajah Charles Vyner Brooke gave a speech on the benefits for Sarawak as a Crown colony:

... Nevertheless I took this decision because I know that it was in the best interests of the people of Sarawak and that in the turmoil of the modern world they would benefit greatly from the experience, strength and wisdom of British Rule.

— reported by The Sarawak Gazette, 2 July 1947, p. 118.

The first governor did not arrive until 29 October 1946. Sarawak was a British Crown colony for 17 years before participating in the formation of Malaysia.

=== Anti-cession movement ===
The cession has sparked nationalism among Malay intellectuals. They started the anti-cession movement with their main centre of operation in Sibu and Kuching. Meanwhile, the majority of Chinese supported the cession because the British would bring more economic benefits to Sarawak and illegal gambling and the opium trade would be banned under British rule which would also benefit the economy. The majority of the Iban people respected the decision made by the Rajah as they believed that he acted on the best interests of the Sarawak people. Meanwhile, the Indians in Sarawak also supported the cession as they viewed the British governing principle as satisfactory.

The Malays established the Malay Youth Association (Malay: Persatuan Pemuda Melayu (PSM)) in Sibu and the Malay National Union of Sarawak (Malay:Persatuan Kebangsaan Melayu Sarawak (PKMS)) in Kuching. Those civil servants who resigned from their government posts established a group called "Group 338" to symbolise the prophet Muhammad when he led 338 infantry to victory in the Battle of Badr. Initially they organised talks, hung posters, signed memorandums, and took part in demonstrations in order to express their dissatisfaction over the cession. Anthony Brooke also tried to oppose the cession but was banned from entering Sarawak by the British colonial government. The demands and appeals by the Malay community was not heeded by the British. This caused a more radical organisation to be established in Sibu on 20 August 1948, known as Rukun 13, with Awang Rambli as their leader. In Awang Rambli's opinion:

It is useless that we organise such demonstrations for prolong periods of time while waiting for miracles to happen. We must remember that independence is still in our hands if we decided to sacrifice our lives. There is no other better person to kill other than the governor.

— reported by Syed Hussein Alattas in 1975

Thus, the second governor of Sarawak, Duncan Stewart was stabbed by Rosli Dhobi in Sibu on 3 December 1949. Following this, Rukun 13 was outlawed with Rosli Dhobi and three other members of the organisation hanged with the rest jailed. This incident increased the British effort to clamp down on the anti-cession movement of Sarawak. All the organisations related to anti-cession were banned and anti-cession documents were seized. Following the incident, Anthony Brooke tried to distance himself from the anti-cession movement for fear of being associated with the plot to kill the governor of Sarawak. The people of Sarawak were also afraid to lend support to the anti-cession movement for fear of backlash from the British colonial government. This led to the end of anti-cession movement in February 1951. Although the anti-cession movement ended as a failure, Malaysian historians regarded this incident as a starting point of nationalism among the natives in Sarawak. This incident also sent the British a message that the local people of Sarawak should not be taken lightly. The British had described the members of Rukun 13 as traitors but in the eyes of Malaysian historians, the Rukun 13 members are regarded as heroes that fight for the independence of Sarawak.

On 4 February 1951, various anti-cession organisations in Sarawak sent a telegram to the British prime minister on plans on the future of Sarawak. They received a reply from the British prime minister which assured them of the British intentions to guide Sarawak towards self-governance in the Commonwealth of Nations and that the people of Sarawak were free to express their views through proper channels according to the constitution, and their opinions would be given full consideration by the British government.

=== Later development ===
In 1959, in response to a petition written to the Queen, the British government assured that the British government would not desert the responsibility of developing Sarawak until the Sarawak people were able to govern their own country properly.

== Administration ==
The governor of British Crown Colony of Sarawak (Malay: Tuan Yang Terutama Gabenor Koloni Mahkota British Sarawak) was a position created by the British government upon the cession of Sarawak by the Brooke Administration in 1946. The appointment was made by King George VI, and later by Queen Elizabeth II until the formation of the Federation of Malaysia in 1963. After the formation of Malaysia, the title was changed to 'Governor of the state of Sarawak' and the appointment was later made by the Yang di-Pertuan Agong (King of Malaysia). The official residence of the governor of Sarawak was The Astana, located on the north bank of the Sarawak River.

Governor of British Crown Colony of Sarawak
- Style: His Excellency
- Residence: The Astana
- Appointer: George VI succeeded in 1952 by Elizabeth II
- Inaugural holder: Charles Arden-Clarke
- Formation: 1946–1963
- Final holder: Alexander Waddell
- Abolished: 16 September 1963 (Formed the Federation of Malaysia)

List of governors of the Crown Colony of Sarawak
No.	Name	Took office	Left office	Note
1.	Charles Arden-Clarke	29 October 1946	27 July 1949	First governor of the Crown Colony of Sarawak.
2.	Duncan Stewart	31 October 1949	10 December 1949	Assassinated by Rosli Dhobi while visiting Sibu on 3 December 1949, and died on 10 December.
3.	Anthony Abell	11 December 1949	16 November 1959	Originally appointed for the term of 3 years only, but his term was extended to 1959. He was later a member of the Cobbold Commission.
4.	Alexander Waddell	23 February 1960	15 September 1963	Last governor of Sarawak.

Sarawak was perhaps unique among Crown colonies in that pre-existing institutions of government continued under the new regime. The Supreme Council and Council Negri, established under the Brookes' 1941 constitution, retained their prerogatives with the rajah being replaced by a governor. Even so, these bodies were entirely appointed. In 1954, the Council Negri had legislative and financial authority and consisted of 25 members: 14 officials from the civil service, and 11 non-officials representing various ethnic and interest groups. In exercising his powers, the governor was required to consult with the Supreme Council.

In terms of local government, the territory was divided into five divisions each overseen by a resident. Each division was sub-divided into districts overseen by district officers, and these were further divided into sub-districts. Each division and district had an advisory council and districts sometimes also had a Chinese Advisory Board. The government also began constructing a system of local authorities before the war and by 1954 about 260,000 people were living in incorporated areas. While early local authorities were race-based, this was found to be an unworkable system and local authorities were soon integrated.

In 1956, the constitution was reformed to increase democratic representation. The Council Negri was enlarged to 45 members, of which 24 were elected non-officials, 14 were ex-officio, 4 were appointed to represent interests considered insufficiently represented by the governor and 3 standing members. The new Supreme Council consisted of three ex-officio members (the Chief Secretary, the Financial Secretary and the Attorney-General), two appointed members, and five members elected from the Council Negri.

== Economy ==
The economy of Sarawak was heavily dependent on the agricultural sector and was heavily influenced by government expenditure on the economy, and imports and exports of goods. Consumption and investments made up only a small part of the economy as the majority of the population were working in the agricultural sector. The private and commercial economy in Sarawak was dominated by the Chinese although the majority of the Chinese worked in farming. The annual Sarawak budget can be divided into two parts: recurrent budget and capital budget. Recurrent budget was the annual commitment by the government for spending in public services. Its revenue is derived from regular, reliable source of income. Capital budget was used for long-term development in Sarawak. Its revenue was derived from unpredictable sources of income such as grants from the British colonial development and welfare fund, loans, and surpluses from export duties. From 1947 to 1962, the total government revenue was increasing from 12 million to 78 million dollars yearly, with total expenditure increasing steadily from 10 million to 82 million dollars per year. There were only three years where the government budget showed deficits (1949, 1958, 1962). There are no known gross domestic product (GDP) figures during this period due to a lack of data. Although several new tax and business legislations were introduced during the colonial period, there were few practising lawyers available. This was partly due to Brooke regime of not allowing lawyers to practice in Sarawak. Therefore, cases seldom reach the court level. Agriculture in Sarawak was poorly developed during the period due to the lack of education among farmers that used the wasteful slash-and-burn technique in farming, lack of communications, and failure to diversify away from rubber.

After the Japanese occupation, Rajah Charles Vyner Brooke signed the last supply ordinance for the budget expenditure in Sarawak in 1946. The majority of expenditure went into "Arrears of Pension" (amounting to one million dollars), probably to pay for government servants who were held by or working during the Japanese occupation. This was followed by expenditure for the treasury, public works, pensions and provident fund, medical and health, and Sarawak Constabulary. Public works expenditure accounted for only 5.5% of the total expenditure even after the destruction during the Japanese occupation. Following the formation of British Crown colony, public works and the treasury became the immediate priority for the post war reconstruction and restructuring of government finances. This was followed closely by pensions, constabulary, and health. Public works remained as the major expenditure until 1950. In 1951, expenditures on aviation was specifically allocated as compared to previous years where this subject was put inside the "Landing grounds" expenditure. The 1951 budget put more emphasis on the allocations for local authorities, native affairs, defence, and internal security, which overshadowed the expenditures on public works. In 1952, contributions for war damage commission was drastically increased. In In 1953, allocation were increased for developmental projects. In 1956, expenditures for education were substantially increased, and accounted for 15.5% of the total budget in 1957. Expenses on education occupied a significant proportion on the budget until the end of the colonial period. The majority of the education expenditures were put into primary and secondary schools. Tertiary education only started to appear in Sarawak in 1961 following the formation of Batu Lintang Teachers' Training College. Expenditures on forestry had also been increasing during the colonial period. Expenditures on defence was minimal throughout the period because Britain was solely responsible for defence in Sarawak. There was a jump in revenue from income tax in 1952, although customs and excise duties still constituted the largest income earner for the government throughout the colonial period. However, revenue collected from income tax had been decreasing steadily throughout the colonial period.

Rice was a major import item in Sarawak. Although rice is grown in Sarawak, it had not been sufficient to feed the population since the Brooke era. Another major import was the oil from the Seria oilfields for processing at the Lutong oil refinery to produce gasoline, kerosene, gas, fuel oil, and diesel fuel. Major export items were: rubber, pepper, sago flour, Jelutong (a source of rubber), sawn timber, Copra seeds, and petroleum. There were only five rubber estates at that time covering only 2,854 hectares compared to 80,000 hectares in small holdings. There was an increase in government revenue from 1950 to 1952 due to the effects of Korean War which raised the demand for rubber. By 1956, pepper exports from Sarawak accounted for one third of the world's pepper production. The importance of Jelutong exports declined throughout the colonial area. Petroleum was the major income earner for Sarawak during this period. Initially, the colonial government exported gold to foreign markets but after 1959, government involvement in gold exports ceased, leaving miners to sell gold in the local and other free markets. Bauxite exports from the first division (Sematan) was increasing during the second half of the colonial period but by the end of the colonial period, this mineral was exhausted.

Overall, the government expenditures during the colonial era increased substantially in all sectors when compared to the Brooke era. However, they were still lagging behind when compared to the states of the Malayan Peninsula. According to a research done by Alexander Gordon Crocker, such budget expenditures showed that the colonial government was trying to develop Sarawak instead of exploiting the natural resources in the state.

== Demographics ==
A census conducted in 1947 shown that the population in Sarawak was 546,385 with Iban people, Chinese, and Malay making up 79.3% of the population. At the beginning of the colonial period, 72% of the population were subsistence farmers, 13% were growing cash crops and 15% were paid workers. Among the various ethnic groups in Sarawak, only the Chinese were closely associated with entrepreneurship.

Ethnic groups in Sarawak (1947)
Ethnic	Percent
Iban	34.8%
Chinese	26.6%
Malay	17.9%
Bidayuh	7.7%
Melanau	6.5%
Others (indigenous)	5.5%
European	0.1%
Others (non-indigenous)	0.9%

Historical population
Year	Pop.	±%
1947	546,385	—
1948*	554,786	+1.5%
1949*	563,187	+1.5%
1950*	571,558	+1.5%
1951*	579,989	+1.5%
1952*	588,390	+1.4%
1953	596,790	+1.4%
1954*	607,919	+1.9%
1955*	620,056	+2.0%
1956	631,431	+1.8%
1957	648,362	+2.7%
1958*	675,994	+4.3%
1959	703,525	+4.1%
1960	752,314	+6.9%
1961	768,545	+2.2%
1962	776,990	+1.1%
* Interplolated figures All the yearly data in the table were ending on 31 December except for 1962 which was ending in June. No census data available from 1948–1952 and 1958. Therefore, the yearly data are interpolated by dividing the differences between the years equally. Data from 1954 and 1955 were ending in June. Therefore, the figures are interpolated to 31 December for both years. Source:

== Infrastructure ==
=== Education ===
Several reports such as Woodhead report (1954), Mc Lellan report (1960) advocated the usage of the English language in Chinese and secondary schools respectively. The governor of Sarawak, in a speech delivered to Council Negri (today Sarawak state legislative assembly) in 1960, echoed the usage of the English language in all secondary schools.

Student enrollment increased steadily every year. In 1957, there were 79,407 students. A total of 70 primary schools were opened in 1957.

Batu Lintang Teacher Training Centre (BLTTC) opened in 1948 to train teachers for rural native vernacular schools. English language training courses were offered to the teachers. A lower secondary school was also attached to BLTTC where the selected students from primary schools were enrolled. Students who graduated from the secondary school was able to train as teachers at BLTTC or join the civil service. In order to raise adult literacy in the rural areas and to improve the natives' agricultural productivity, Kanowit Rural Improvement School was opened in May 1948. However, due to the apathy of the natives towards education, there was only a slight improvement of the literacy rate from 1947 to 1960. The Rural Improvement School was subsequently closed down in 1957.

=== Electricity ===
Miri, Bintulu, and Limbang had been devastated by allied bombings during the war. The people of Miri were dependent on a generator set brought by the Japanese from Jesselton (now Kota Kinabalu). Similarly, the towns of Kapit, Kanowit, and Song were destroyed during the anarchy of the last days of war. Sarawak Electricity Supply Company (SESCo) was reinstated after the war; however, it struggled to keep up with the growing demand of electricity in major townships due to a lack of spare parts, constant wear and tear, and the lack of proper maintenance of the equipment. SESCo also took over the power plants at Miri from Sarawak Oil Fields Limited. The people from major towns continue to suffer from erratic supply of electricity until 1953 when electrical supply was restored to pre-war capacity. In that year, electrical supply was expanded to five new places in Sarawak. SESCo continued to operate until 1 January 1963, when it was turn into Sarawak Electricity Supply Corporation (SESCO).

=== Healthcare ===
Malaria was endemic in Sarawak. However, the first proper survey of malaria prevalence in Sarawak was only done from 1952 to 1953. The survey result found that the coastal areas had low malarial prevalence while the hilly and mountainous interior was prevalent with the disease.

Medical services in Sarawak became part of the British Colonial Medical Service. Medical personnel had to be imported from the Malayan Union (modern Peninsular Malaysia). (Note: Sarawak Health, 2014. p. 2) The Sarawak Medical Department was established as a separate entity on 21 July 1947. The department's expenditure was about 10% of the government revenue. (Note: Sarawak Health, 2014. p. 3) There was a shortage of manpower, including doctors, dressers (also known as hospital assistants), and nurses. By 1959, the staffing position had greatly improved. Divisional medical officers (equivalent to chief medical and health officers today) were appointed, and more nursing schools and rural dispensaries were opened. (Note: Sarawak Health, 2014. p. 3) Various projects were started, such as a malaria control project (1953) and a tuberculosis control project (1960). Laws such as the Medical Registration Ordinance (1948), the Dentist Registration Ordinance (1948), the Dangerous Drugs Ordinance (1952), and the Public Health Ordinance (1963) were passed. (Note: Sarawak Health, 2014. p. 4)

In 1947, there were only two government hospitals in Sarawak: Kuching General Hospital (now Sarawak General Hospital) (255 beds) and Sibu Lau King Howe Hospital (now Lau King Howe Hospital Memorial Museum) (55 beds). In Miri, a hospital was built by Sarawak Shell Oilfields Limited. There was an agreement with the government of Brunei to admit patients from Limbang into the Brunei State Hospital. There were regular monthly visits from Brunei Health Services to Limbang. (Note: Sarawak Health, 2014. p. 4) In 1957, Sarawak Mental Hospital was constructed in Kuching. (Note: Sarawak Health, 2014. p. 5) In 1952, a government hospital was constructed in Miri., (Note: Sarawak Health, 2014. p. 355) followed by Christ Hospital built by American Methodists in Kapit in 1957, (Note: Sarawak Health, 2014. p. 360) and Limbang Hospital in 1958. (Note: Sarawak Health, 2014. p. 365) In 1947, there were 21 rural dispensaries attended by a dresser and an attendant. (Note: Sarawak Health, 2014. p. 5) Kanowit dispensary and Saratok dispensary were opened in 1953 (Note: Sarawak Health, 2014. p. 369) and 1960 respectively. (Note: Sarawak Health, 2014. p. 371) The total annual workload of these dispensaries was 130,000 patients. (Note: Sarawak Health, 2014. p. 6) In 1947, the colonial government allocated a grant for the setting up of two rural dispensaries and 16 mobile dispensaries. However, due to the difficulty of recruiting the necessary manpower, only two mobile dispensaries were operational at the Rajang River to cater the needs of the rural communities. (Note: Sarawak Health, 2014. pp. 6–7)

The Japanese occupation had disrupted dental services in Sarawak. In 1949, an Australian dental surgeon was put in charge of dental services in Sarawak. British Council and Colombo Plan scholarships were set up to produce more dentists for the state. (Note: Sarawak Health, 2014. p. 203) In the 1950s, dental nurses were recruited. Hospital-based dental services were extended to Sibu and Miri in 1959 and 1960. In 1961, fluoridation of the public water supply in Simanggang (now Sri Aman) was implemented. (Note: Sarawak Health, 2014. p. 204)

== Culture ==
On 8 June 1954, Radio Sarawak was set up with the technical assistance from the BBC. The broadcasting service had four sections: Malay, Iban, Chinese, and English. The Iban section was broadcast from 7 pm to 8 pm daily, covering news, farming, animal husbandry, Iban folklore and epics. In 1958, School Broadcasting Service was set up under the Colombo Plan. English lessons began in 1959. Radio sets were distributed to primary schools for pupils to learn the English language. In 1960s, there were 467 participating schools in Sarawak with 850 teachers attended 11 training courses. With the formation of Malaysia in 1963, Radio Sarawak was renamed as Radio Malaysia Sarawak.

The colonial government recognised that British education and indigenous culture was influencing a new generation of Iban teachers. Thus, on 15 September 1958, the Borneo Literature Bureau (BLB) was inaugurated with a charter to nurture and encourage local literature while also supporting the government in its release of documentation, particularly in technical and instructional manuscripts that were to be distributed to the indigenous peoples of Sarawak and Sabah. As well as indigenous languages, documents were published in English, Chinese and Malay. The BLB published a total of 191 issues of "Dolphin" magazines from November 1961 to September 1977, targeting upper primary and secondary school students, in order to provide alternative reading materials after banning the leftist literature during the Sarawak Communist Insurgency.

After the war, artists in Sarawak especially in Kuching area chose gentle themes and social wellbeing as their drawing subjects such as scenery and nature, and indigenous characteristics such as cockfighting and traditional dances.

== See also ==
- Anti-cession movement of Sarawak
- Raj of Sarawak
