= Alexander Grant (British Army officer) =

British captain of the Royal African Corps and colonial administrator of Gambia

Lieutenant-Colonel Sir Alexander Grant
- Born: 1775
- Died: 1827 (aged 51–52)
- Military career
- Allegiance: United Kingdom
- Branch: British Army
- Service years: 1804–1826
- Rank: Lieutenant Colonel
- Units: 2nd West India Regiment; Royal African Corps
- Commands: St Mary's Island
- Awards: Knight Bachelor

Sir Alexander Grant (1775 – 29 September 1827) was a British Army officer who served as the first Commandant of St Mary's Island from 1816 to 1826.

An officer with the newly-founded Royal African Corps, Grant negotiated the purchase of St Mary's Island in the Gambia River from the King of Kombo in 1816, following the end of the Napoleonic Wars. The island was the first settlement in what would later become the Gambia Colony and Protectorate. During his time as commandant, Grant founded the town of Bathurst on the island, which later became Banjul and the capital city of The Gambia as an independent country. Grant also purchased MacCarthy Island, further down the Gambia River, and founded on it Georgetown - now Janjanbureh - as a settlement for freed slaves.

Grant was knighted in 1821, and served as Acting Governor of Sierra Leone from 1820 to 1821, and again later in 1821. He returned to Britain in 1826, and died a year later from illness.

== Early military service ==
Grant joined the army in 1804 and was posted to the 2nd West India Regiment. He was immediately given the option of serving with the Royal African Corps, which he took up, and remained in Africa until 1825.

== Commandant of St Mary's Island ==
=== Establishment of Bathurst ===
Following the Treaty of Paris in 1814, which ended the war with France and the War of 1812 with the United States, the British evacuated Gorée, in what is now Senegal. This meant the Gambia once again assumed importance as the nearest harbour and colony to Britain situated on the West African coast. It, therefore, became necessary that the British rebuild their forts and make other arrangements to accommodate the influx of troops and officials from Gorée.

Sir Charles MacCarthy, the Governor of Sierra Leone, dispatched Captain Alexander Grant, who at the time was an officer with the 2nd West India Regiment and was attached to the Royal African Corps. Grant took with him a detachment of 75 soldiers of the Royal African Corps to establish whether it would be feasible to create a military stronghold on the Gambia River. At first, it was intended that Grant would rebuild Fort James, but the lack of room on the island led to Grant being asked to explore other options. Lieutenant Colonel Thomas Brereton, the Governor of Senegal, approved the sandy pit at the extreme point of Banjulo, "probably more from a strategic view than a sanitary one" as it was battered by the Atlantic waves, had a mangrove swamp behind it, but also commanded the mouth of the Gambia River.

On 23 April 1816, Grant signed a treaty with the King of Kombo, Tomani Bojang. The treaty stipulated the lease of the island for an annual payment by the British of 103 iron bars, the equivalent of £25 at the time. Brereton aided Grant in this negotiation. Following its lease, the island was renamed from Banjulo to St Mary's Island. The houses, barracks, stores, factories, forts and other buildings were built around the crescent-shaped sandbank and gradually the land behind was partly reclaimed. The barracks on the island could hold 80 soldiers and house six cannons. The town was drained with tidal sluices to prevent the flooding of the town by sea water. This new capital on St Mary's Island was initially called Leopold, but the name was shortly afterwards changed to Bathurst by MacCarthy, under whom the town was designed. The name was taken from Earl Bathurst, who was then the Secretary of State for War and the Colonies.

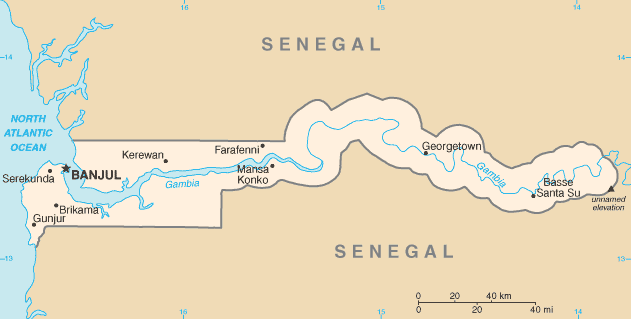
A modern-day map of the Gambia showing Bathurst (Banjul) and Georgetown.

=== Further growth ===
Gun batteries were laid out on Barra Point, Fort St Mary, and in Bathurst for the purposes of defence. As to commerce, the British merchants in Senegal were forced to leave when the Treaty of Paris was ratified and, with some French traders who preferred to trade under the British flag, emigrated to St Mary's Island. They built a number of factories and houses there which remained for many decades. The influx of traders marked a return to prosperity for the Gambia, that had flagged during the British occupation of Senegal. Building Bathurst was complicated by the fact that St Mary's Island was infested with mosquitoes and liable to be flooded regularly. By 1821, a barracks, hospital, and courthouse had all been constructed. Grant also began the practice of sending blue books from the Gambia between 1819 and 1823.

The Governor of Sierra Leone was given responsibility for St Mary's Island in 1821. The home government back in Britain decided that the colony would have to be maintained by the revenue it made from customs duties in all areas besides defence. MacCarthy toured West Africa in 1822, and commented that the improvement of commerce in Bathurst was greater than in any other location that he visited. Grant, as commandant, used his forces to stop the riverine slave trade and also to encourage the activities of the Society of Friends and the Wesleyan Methodist Church.

In 1818, Gaspard Théodore Mollien, a French explorer, explored the sources of the Gambia River, Senegal River and the most northern tributary of the Niger River during Grant's tenure at St Mary's Island. He travelled alone before returning in 1819 by way of the Rio Geba. From 28 July 1820 to 28 November 1821, with a short break from 1 February 1821 to 4 February, Grant served as the acting Governor of Sierra Leone. This was in between two terms served by MacCarthy in the country. On 18 December 1821, Grant was promoted to major. In 1823, Sierra Leone was chosen as the seat of government for the British West African Settlements, and annexed by Act of Parliament with a jurisdiction that included the Gambia.

=== MacCarthy Island and the Ceded Mile ===
Lemain Island was purchased as an outpost in 1823, 160 miles up the Gambia. The name was then changed to MacCarthy Island. A Government House was built, with a barracks for a company of soldiers, called Fort George. Grant established Georgetown on the island, as a settlement for freed slaves. MacCarthy Island at the time was notorious for fighting and rumours of fighting, with night alarms and "enough excitement to satisfy the most energetic soldiers seeking a show". The soldiers on the island were ten to twelve days from headquarters and surrounded by warring tribes, who saw the British presence as "the first step towards their total dispossession." On 8 January 1824, Grant was promoted to lieutenant colonel, without purchase, meaning he earned the promotion on merit and not by payment.

After the establishment of a base on MacCarthy Island, Grant oversaw the acquisition of what was known as the Ceded Mile. It was a strip of territory one mile wide at the mouth of the Gambia River on the north bank, opposite Bathurst, and stretching from the ocean inland as far as the eastern boundary of the Kingdom of Barra. Burungai Sonko, the King of Barra, agreed to the deal – which led to the British constructed Fort Bullen in the Ceded Mile over the next five years. St Mary's Island, which was still being leased from the King of Barra, was also annexed and formally became British territory.

On 1 August 1826, Grant was formally succeeded by Captain Alexander Findlay as the commandant. During Grant's time as commandant, the population of Bathurst had increased from about 700 in 1818, to 1,800 in 1826. This was due to an influx of Liberated Africans from Sierra Leone. Grant had also served as acting Governor of Sierra Leone in 1820 and in 1821 and became the first Governor of Sierra Leone to receive a knighthood.

== Retirement and death ==
Grant returned to Britain in 1825 "with a broken constitution." After a year spent on leave in Britain, he decided that he was too ill to continue in the Army and so retired. A short obituary in the London Courier and Gazette states that he "soon after fell a sacrifice to the effects of a climate that has been fatal to so many Europeans" and died on 29 September 1827. The obituary went on to state that "for many years, when there was a post of difficulty or of danger, Colonel Grant was selected for it by the late Governor, Sir Charles McCarthy, whose confidence, esteem, and friendship, he possessed in the fullest measure."

Government offices
New creation	Commandant of St Mary's Island; 1816—1826	Succeeded by Alexander Findlay
Preceded by Sir Charles MacCarthy	Acting Governor of Sierra Leone; 1820—1821	Succeeded by E. Burke
Preceded by E. Burke	Acting Governor of Sierra Leone; 1821	Succeeded by Sir Charles MacCarthy
