= List of colonial governors and administrators of Tobago =

This article lists governors of Tobago. Governors of Tobago have been referred to by the formal titles of "Governor" and "Lieutenant-Governor". For governors of the united Trinidad and Tobago after 1889 see List of governors of Trinidad and Tobago.

== Lieutenant governors of British Tobago (1764–1781) ==
- Alexander Brown (Lt Governor of Tobago) – 12 November 1764 – July 1766
- William Hill – 2 December 1766 – 16 October 1767
- Roderick Gwynne – 16 October 1767 – 1769
- Robert William Stewart – 1769–1771
- William Young (Lt. Governor of Tobago) of Auchenskeoch Castle (Scotland) – 1771–1777
- Peter Campbell (Lt Governor of Tobago) – 1777–1779
- John Graham (Lt Governor of Tobago) – 1779–1781
- George Ferguson (Lt Governor of Tobago) – 1781 – 2 June 1781

== Governors of French Tobago (1781–1793) ==
- Philibert François Rouxel de Blanchelande – 2 June 1781 – 1784
- Rene Maria viconte d'Arrot – 1784–1786
- Arthur Dillon – 1786–1789
- Antoine de Jobal de Poigny – 1789–1792
- Philippe Marie de Marguenat – 1792–1793
- Laroque de Mointeil – 1793

== Governors of British Tobago (1793–1899) ==
- William Myers – April 1793
- George Poyntz Ricketts – 1793–1795
- Joseph Robley – 1795 (acting)
- William Lindsay – 1795–1796
- James Campbell – 1796–1797
- Stephen de Lancey – 1797–1799
- Joseph Robley – 1799–1800 (acting)
- Richard Master – 1800
- Joseph Robley – 1800–1801 (acting)
- Hugh Lyle Carmichael - 1801 – 7 November 1802 (acting)
- Jean Joseph François de Sahuguet d'Amarzit de Laroche – 7 November 1802 – 1803
- Louis Cesar Gabriel Berthier – 1803
- Thomas Picton – 30 June 1803 – July 1803
- William Johnstone – July 1803 – August 1803
- Donald MacDonald – August 1803 – July 1804
- John Halkett – July 1804 – 1807
- Sir William Young, 2nd Baronet – 1807–1815
- John Balfour – 1815–1816
- John Campbell – 1816
- Sir Frederick Philipse Robinson – November 1816
- Sir Colin Campbell - February 1828 - April 1828
- Nathaniel Blackwell – April 1828 – 1833
- Alexander Gardner – 1833 – (Acting)
- General Sir Lionel Smith – 1833
- General Sir Henry Charles Darling – 1833–1845
- Laurence Graeme – 1845–1851
- David Robert Ross – 16 April 1851 – 26 June 1851
- Henry Yates – 1851–1852 – (1st Time / Acting)
- Dominick Daly September 1851 – 1852
- Henry Yates – 1852 – February 1854 – (2nd Time / Acting)
- Willoughby J. Shortland – February 1854 – 1856
- James Kirk – 1856 – (Acting)
- James Henry Keens – 1856–1857 – (Acting)
- James Vickery Drysdale – June 1857 – April 1864
- Cornelius Hendricksen Kortright – October 1864 – 1872
- Herbert Taylor Ussher – 1872–1875
- Robert William Harley – 1875–1877
- Augustus Fredrick Gore – 1877–1880
- Edward Laborde – 1880–1882
- John Worrell Carrington – 1883–1884
- Loraine Geddes Hay – 1885
- Robert Baxter Llewellyn – 1885–1888
- Loraine Geddes Hay – 1888–1892
- Thomas Crossley Rayner – 1892
- William Low – 1892–1893
- Herbert H. Sealy – 1893 (acting)
- William Low – 1893–1897
- S. W. Snaggs – 1897 (acting)
- Joseph Clanfergael O'Halloran – 1897–1899

== See also ==
- List of governors of Trinidad
- List of governors of Trinidad and Tobago
- List of governors-general of Trinidad and Tobago
- History of Tobago
- List of presidents of Trinidad and Tobago
- List of prime ministers of Trinidad and Tobago
