= George Chardin Denton =

Sir George Chardin Denton KCMG FRGS FZS
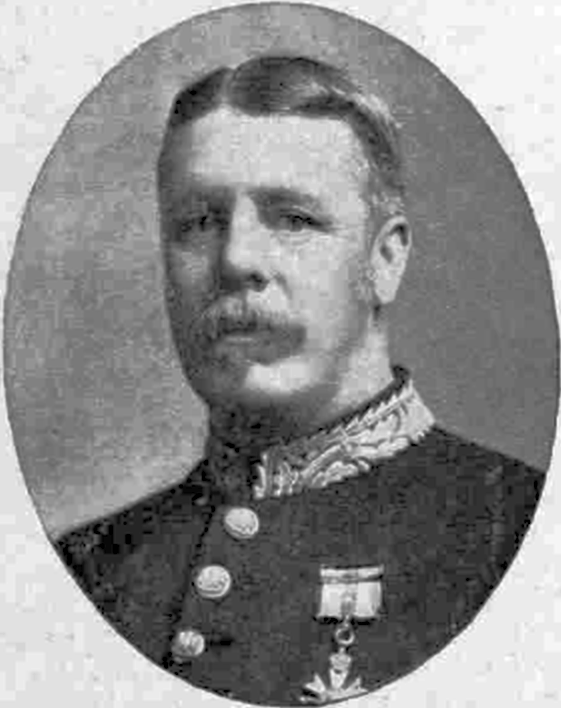

Governor of the Gambia
- In office 11 January 1901 – 21 December 1911
- Monarchs: Victoria; Edward VII; George V
- Preceded by: Himself
- Succeeded by: Henry Galway

Administrator of the Gambia
- In office November 1900 – 11 January 1901
- Monarch: Victoria
- Preceded by: Robert Baxter Llewelyn
- Succeeded by: Himself (as Governor)

Lieutenant Governor of Lagos (Acting)
- In office 1889–1890
- Monarch: Victoria
- Preceded by: Cornelius Alfred Moloney
- Succeeded by: Gilbert Thomas Carter

Personal details
- Born: 22 June 1851 Stour Provost, Dorset, England
- Died: 9 January 1928 (aged 76) Chigwell Row, Essex, England
- Resting place: St Clement's churchyard, Oxford, England
- Education: Rugby School

Military service
- Branch/service: British Army
- Years of service: 1869–1880
- Rank: Captain
- Unit: 57th Regiment

Sir George Chardin Denton KCMG FRGS FZS (22 June 1851 – 9 January 1928) was a British colonial administrator and former military officer who served as the Administrator, and later Governor, of the Gambia from 1900 to 1911.

== Early life and education ==
He was born in Stour Provost, Dorset, England, the son of the local Anglican vicar. He attended Rugby School before enlisting in the 57th Regiment in 1869, rising to the rank of captain.

== Military and colonial service ==
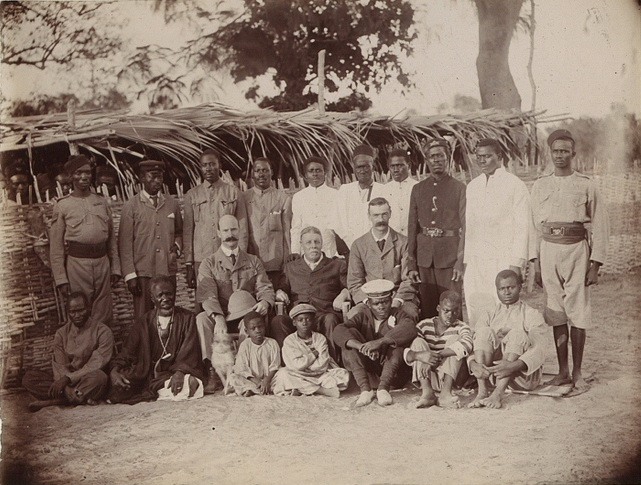
Denton and his party, 1905

In 1880, Denton joined the Colonial Service as chief of police on Saint Vincent. He served as its acting Colonial Secretary from 1886 to 1888 and was appointed as Colonial Secretary of the Colony of Lagos in 1889. He was knighted in January 1889. Denton was appointed as Lieutenant Governor of the Colony of Lagos in early March 1900, but in November of that year was reassigned as Administrator of the Gambia. Upon his appointment, he was described by the St James's Gazette as a "many-sided man" due to his interests in geography and zoology.

In March 1901, his position was upgraded from Administrator to Governor, the first Governor of the Gambia since 1866. As Governor, Denton completed the work began by his predecessor, Robert Baxter Llewelyn, in establishing the framework of British rule in the Protectorate. He did this by issuing a series of ordinances that clarified and set out the system. Denton also led the punitive expedition against Fode Kaba in 1901, a leading resistance leader in the Senegambia region, which led to Kaba's death. Denton also successfully argued against the requirements of the Entente Cordiale, which would have assigned a mid-river port on the Gambia to the French. Denton said that the port would destroy British trade on the river and was a key factor in the British delaying their planned cession until after World War I, and, in the end, delay the plans indefinitely.

In 1902, on leave from the Gambia in England, Denton brought the Zoological Society of London five mammals and five birds, which, according to the London Evening Standard, had been "unrepresented for a considerable time in the menagerie."

Mary Gaunt, upon meeting Denton, described him as "surely the nicest governor ever lucky colony had".

Denton also made a contribution to domestic politics in the Gambia, appointing S. J. Forster Jr, to the Legislative Council in 1906. Denton retired from the Gambia in December 1911. According to his obituary published in The Times he ensured that "considerable progress was made both in the condition of the [Gambian] people and in trade."

== Retirement ==
Denton retired to England after his service in the Gambia concluded in 1911. He died in 1928 at Chigwell Row in Essex and is buried in St Clement's churchyard in Oxford.
