= Daniel Robertson (colonial administrator) =

Colonial Secretary of the Gambia
- In office 1849 – c. 1865
- Preceded by: Thomas Lewis Ingram

Personal details
- Born: 1813 Scotland
- Died: 1892 (aged 78–79) Gateshead, England
- Children: James Robertson

Daniel Robertson (1813 – 1892) was a British colonial administrator who served as Colonial Secretary of the Gambia from 1849 to circa 1865. He was Acting Governor of the Gambia from April 1859 to September 1859, and in 1851.

== Biography ==
=== Early life ===
Robertson was born in Scotland.

=== Colonial service ===
Robertson arrived in the Gambia in 1832 as a surgeon for the Liberated Africans Department of the Gambian colonial government. On the advice of Anthony Clogstoun, he was promoted to Colonial Surgeon in 1838.

Robertson was appointed as Colonial Secretary of the Gambia in June 1849. He served under Richard Graves MacDonnell, Arthur Kennedy, Luke Smythe O'Connor, and George Abbas Kooli D'Arcy. During the Soninke-Marabout War, when O'Connor's force was defeated at Bakkow Wood by a force of Marabouts, Robertson hastily armed a number of Government servants, merchants, and other loyalists, while sending messages of distress to Sierra Leone and Gorée. Robertson briefly served as Acting Governor after O'Connor left the Gambia in 1856 for Edinburgh. He again served as Acting Governor from April 1859 to September 1859 in between O'Connor leaving and D'Arcy arriving.

Robertson was summoned to speak before a Select Committee at the House of Commons in 1865 that examined the report on the governance of West Africa by Harry Ord. Gray notes that Robertson had come "quite unprepared for a summons of this nature" and he suffered from not being able to "consult the necessary documents." He was the only witness called upon that had experience of governing in the Gambia.

=== Personal life ===
Robertson died on 24 November 1892 in Gateshead.

Robertson's son, James Robertson, married Emily Maud in 1880. He trained as a doctor, and died in 1900, aged 46.
