= Charles Workman =

Charles Workman may refer to:

- Charles H. Workman (1872–1923), English singer and actor
- Charles Rufus Marshall Workman (1874–1942), British colonial administrator
- Chuck Workman (baseball) (Charles Thomas Workman, 1915–1953), American baseball player
- Charles Workman (1908–1979), hitman who killed Dutch Schultz

== See also ==
- Chuck Workman, American documentary filmmaker
