= Charles George Edward Patey =

Royal Navy Admiral (1811–1881)

Admiral Charles George Edward Patey CMG
- Born: 27 February 1811; Chivelstone, Devon, England, UK
- Died: 25 March 1881 (aged 70); Newton St Loe, Bath, Somerset, UK
- Military career
- Allegiance: Great Britain
- Branch: Royal Navy
- Rank: Admiral
- Awards: Companion of the Order of St Michael and St George

Colonial Governor of Saint Helena
- In office 1869–1873

Administrator of The Gambia
- In office 1866–1869
- Preceded by: George Abbas Kooli D'Arcy
- Succeeded by: Alexander Bravo

Admiral Charles George Edward Patey CMG (27 February 1811 – 25 March 1881) was a British Royal Navy officer.

Born in 1811 at Chivelstone in Devon, England, Patey was the eldest son of Commander Charles Patey. The young Charles followed his father into the navy at the age of 13, passing through every commissioned rank in the service to eventually be made an admiral of the Royal Navy.

In addition to his distinguished naval record, Admiral Patey was also appointed administrator of Lagos, and of the Gambia, as well as serving as Governor of Saint Helena between 1869 and 1873. In recognition of his services Admiral Patey was awarded the Companion of the Order of St Michael and St George in 1874.

Admiral Patey died in 1881 at Newton St Loe, a small village just outside Bath. Six officers acted as pallbearers at the funeral, among them three admirals.

== See also ==
- O'Byrne, William Richard (1849). "Patey, Charles George Edward" . A Naval Biographical Dictionary . John Murray – via Wikisource.
