= Sir Lionel Smith, 1st Baronet =

British diplomat, colonial administrator and soldier

General Sir Lionel Smith, 1st Baronet, GCB, GCH (9 October 1778 – 2 January 1842) was a British diplomat, colonial administrator, and soldier.

== Life ==
His mother was noted writer and feminist Charlotte Smith. His father was Benjamin Smith, and his paternal grandfather was Richard Smith, a wealthy merchant and enslaver.

In 1821, General Smith, then serving in the Bombay Army, commanded a punitive campaign against the Bani Bu Ali tribe in Oman. Lionel Smith was Governor of Tobago in 1833 and then Governor of Barbados (1833–1836), Viceroy of the colony of Windward Islands (which then included Grenada) from 1833 to 1836. He was awarded a baronetcy on 19 July 1838 for his service as Governor of Jamaica from 1836 to 1839.

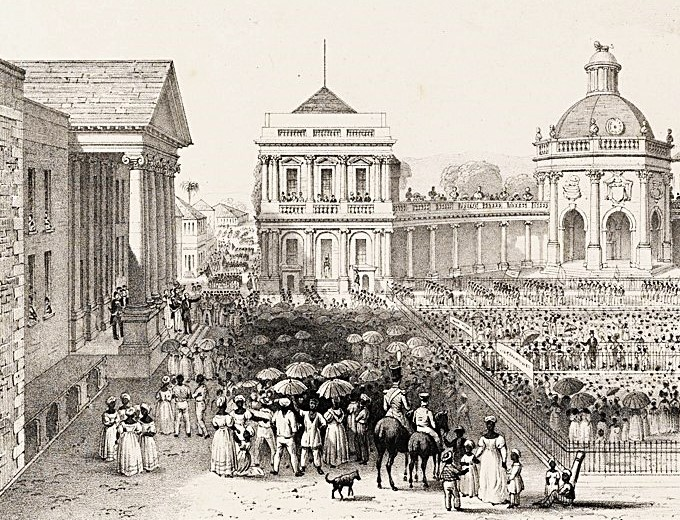
Governor Lionel Smith proclaiming the abolition of slavery in the colony of Jamaica, on 1 August 1838, from the King's House in Spanish Town

During his governorship, the United Kingdom passed the Abolition Act that stated that slavery "shall be and is hereby utterly abolished and unlawful". On 1 August 1838, Governor Sir Lionel read the Proclamation of Freedom to a crowd of 8,000 at the celebration of emancipation in the Square of Spanish Town, the then capital of Jamaica. The day has been a Jamaican celebration and public holiday since 1893.

He was made Colonel of the 96th Regiment of Foot from 1832 to 1834 and later of the 40th Regiment of Foot from 1837 for life.

He left Jamaica in 1839, having run into difficulties with the passing of the Prisons Act and dissolving Jamaica's Assembly. Lionel Town, Clarendon is named after the Governor.

He was the fifth Governor of Mauritius from 16 July 1840 to 2 January 1842.

== Family ==
Smith was twice married:

1. With his first wife, Ellen Marianne (d. 1814), daughter of Thomas Galway of Killery, County Kerry, he had two daughters, Ellen Maria and Mary Anne.
2. On 20 November 1819 he married Isabella Curwen, youngest daughter of Eldred Curwen Pottinger of Mount Pottinger, County Down, and sister of Sir Henry Pottinger. She died three days after her husband, leaving four children, Lionel Eldred, Augusta, Isabella, and Charlotte. Isabella married George Floyd Duckett in 1845.

Baronetage of the United Kingdom
New creation	Baronet (of Jamaica); 1838–1842	Succeeded by Lionel Smith-Gordon
Government offices
Preceded by Nathaniel Blackwell	Governor of Tobago; 1833	Succeeded by Henry Darling
Preceded by Sir James Frederick Lyon	Governor of Barbados and the Windward Islands; 1833–1836	Succeeded by Sir Evan John Murray MacGregor
Preceded by The Marquess of Sligo	Governor of Jamaica; 1836–1839	Succeeded by Sir Charles Metcalfe, Bt
Preceded by Sir William Nicolay	Governor of Mauritius; 1840–1842	Succeeded by Sir William Maynard Gomm
Military offices
Preceded by Sir George Cooke	Colonel of the 40th Regiment of Foot; 1837–1842	Succeeded by Sir Alexander George Woodford
Preceded by Sir Edward Barnes	Colonel of the 78th (Highlanders) Regiment of Foot; 1834–1837	Succeeded by Paul Anderson
Preceded by Sir Joseph Fuller	Colonel of the 96th Regiment of Foot; 1832–1834	Succeeded by Sir William Thornton
