= Cecil Hamilton Armitage =

British colonial officer (1869–1933)

Sir Cecil Hamilton Armitage KBE CMG DSO
- Armitage in 1930.

Governor of the Gambia
- In office 3 January 1921 – 10 March 1927
- Monarch: George V
- Preceded by: Herbert Henniker-Heaton (Acting)
- Succeeded by: John Middleton

Personal details
- Born: 8 October 1869
- Died: 10 March 1933 (aged 63)

Sir Cecil Hamilton Armitage KBE CMG DSO (8 October 1869 – 10 March 1933) was a British colonial officer who served as Governor of the Gambia from 1920 to 1927. He established the Armitage School and the Gambia Department of Agriculture.

== Military career ==
Armitage was an officer with the 3rd Battalion of the South Wales Borderers. In April 1894, he sailed from Liverpool to Accra, having been seconded from his regiment to serve with the Hausa Constabulary on the Gold Coast. He held the rank of Captain at the time and served in the Anglo-Ashanti wars under Sir Francis Scott from 1895 to 1896. Afterwards, he was dispatched to survey a trade route from Geji to Gambaga, in the north of the Gold Coast. Upon arriving in Gambaga county, he offered the protection of the United Kingdom to the local chief at Tamale. However, that evening, the chief and the residents deserted the village, leaving Armitage and his police officers under siege in Tamale for a week.

== Colonial career ==
In 1899, Armitage became the private secretary to Sir Frederick Hodgson, then the Governor of the Gold Coast. He accompanied Hodgson during the Siege of Kumasi from April to June 1900, when he was Acting Resident. When the British forces were able to break out of Kumasi, Armitage led the advance force. He was awarded the Distinguished Service Order for his service in Ashanti. Armitage later became Commissioner in Ashanti, and in 1910 he was appointed Chief Commissioner of the Northern Territories, a position he held until 1920. That year, he became Governor of the Gambia, succeeding Sir Edward Cameron.

As Governor, Armitage founded the Gambia Agricultural Department in 1924, and also the Armitage School in 1927. Upon his retirement in 1927, Armitage commented to the Western Morning News: "I feel very much the severance of the association of almost a lifetime. I have always been absorbed in my official duties in Africa, and now the time has come when I come home, probably for the last time."

== Legacy ==
Armitage is commemorated in the scientific name of a species of West African lizard, Chalcides armitagei.

== Honours ==
Armitage was appointed a Companion of the Order of St Michael and St George (CMG) in the 1911 Coronation Honours, and a Knight Commander of the Order of the Bath (KCB) in the 1926 Birthday Honours.

== Books ==
- The Ashanti Campaign of 1900. London: Sands & Co. 1901.
- The Tribal Markings and Marks of Adornment of the Natives of the Northern Territories of the Gold Coast Colony. Royal Anthropological Institute of Great Britain and Ireland. 1924.

Government offices
Preceded by Herbert Henniker	Governor of The Gambia; 1920–1927	Succeeded by Sir John Middleton
