= James Jackson (colonial administrator) =

James Jackson was a British Army officer who served as the Acting Commandant of St Mary's Island from August 1829 to January 1830.

== Military service ==
Jackson was an officer with the 3rd West India Regiment. He was made an Ensign in 1822, a Lieutenant in 1824, a Captain in 1826, Brevet Major in 1841, and Major in 1842.

During his brief tenure as Commandant, he entered into a treaty with the King of Kombo, Tomani Bojang, for the surrender of fugitive slaves in certain circumstances. However, Gray notes, that treaty was almost exclusively honoured in the breach. It was never forwarded at the time to the government in London, and when it was discovered over a dozen years later, it was repudiated by the Secretary of State for the Colonies.
