= Richard Master (governor) =

British Member of Parliament

Richard Master (1746–1800) was the member of Parliament for the constituency of Cirencester from 1785 to 1792.

He served as Governor of Tobago from 1799 until his death the following year.
