= Joseph Clanfergael O'Halloran =

British colonial administrator (1846–1922)

acting commissioner of Tobago
- Assuming office 1897
- Succeeding: S.W. Saggs

Joseph Clanfergael O'Halloran was a British colonial administrator. From 1897 to 1899 he served as the acting commissioner of the British colony of Tobago.

== Life ==
Joseph Clanfergael O’Halloran was born in 1846 in Kingston upon Hull in the English county of Yorkshire. His grandfather was the highly decorated major-general Joseph O'Halloran.

From 1879 to 1890, O’Halloran served in Mauritius as a police magistrate and as civil commissioner on the island of Rodrigues. In his spare time he engaged in cave exploration and assembled a collection of bones belonging to extinct animals (some of which were endemic to Rodrigues) which he made available to the Royal Society of Arts and Sciences.

From 1897 until 1899 O’Halloran was acting commissioner of the British colony Tobago. His tenure was during a time of radical administrative changes. In 1889, the separate colonies of Trinidad and Tobago, the latter being almost economically insignificant due to the collapse in sugar exports, were merged to form the colony of Trinidad and Tobago. Tobago initially retained a certain degree of administrative sovereignty (especially in terms of finances) and was henceforth administered by a commissioner rather than a governor (the last governor being Robert Baxter Llewelyn). From 1893 this role was held by William Low, who, in early 1897, following the publication of an economic report that proved disastrous for his reputation, requested and was granted a six-month leave of absence. He never returned to his position. The official duties were taken over by his deputy, initially by S. W. Saggs, and later in 1897 by Joseph O'Halloran. The latter retained his post until 1899, the year in which Tobago, as part of a further administrative reform, was downgraded to a simple ward of Trinidad, and the position of commissioner was abolished.

Back in Mauritius, O'Halloran married more than 30 years younger Elizabeth "Bessie" Norman. He died in 1922 in the English county of Sussex.

== Evaluation ==
Amidst the dramatic administrative upheavals in Tobago that were dominated by British and Trinidadian interests, O’Halloran failed to make any significant mark; indeed, the sociologist Susan Craig-James does not even mention him in her seminal work The Changing Society of Tobago, 1838–1938: A Fractured Whole. Volume I: 1838–1900.
