= James Robertson (rugby union, born 1854) =

Scottish rugby union player

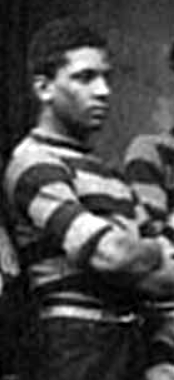
- Robertson in 1871
- Born: James George Robertson; 1854 Banjul, The Gambia
- Died: February , 1900 (aged 46) Royston, England
- School: Madras College
- University: University of St Andrews; University of Edinburgh

Rugby union career
- Position: Forward
Amateur team(s)
Years	Team	Apps	(Points)
1871-75	Royal HSFP	45	
1879-82	Northumberland		
Provincial / State sides
Years	Team	Apps	(Points)
1873-75	Edinburgh District	4	

James George Robertson (c.1854 – February 1900) was a Scottish rugby union player. He is the first black rugby union player in the world.

The Scottish sports historian Andy Mitchell, who researched Robertson's life, stated: "It is intriguing that someone from an unusual background has come to the country and been accepted into society. There is virtually nothing to indicate that he suffered discrimination due to his colour. This raises the question as to whether his social class allowed them to rise above racial discrimination."

== Early years ==
The son of Perthshire surgeon Daniel Robertson, James Robertson was born in Bathurst - now Banjul - in the then-British colony of The Gambia in 1854.

Dr. Daniel Robertson was to become Colonial Secretary of The Gambia. It is there he had two sons, James and John, with a local Gambian woman. Both sons were sent to Scotland for their education.

James was first sent to board at a school in Crieff. He then went to Madras College from 1866 to 1870. A gifted student he then matriculated at the University of St. Andrews. Robertson lasted a year there, but then moved to Edinburgh University to study medicine. He was at Edinburgh for five years.

== Rugby Union career ==
=== Amateur career ===
Robertson played as a forward for Royal HSFP.

He graduated from Edinburgh University in 1876 and found a post in County Durham as the resident medical officer at Gateshead Dispensary. While there, he turned out for Northumberland between 1879 and 1882. In this case, Northumberland was a local club, not the County team.

=== Provincial career ===
He represented Edinburgh District against Glasgow District on 6 December 1873.

== Later life ==
In 1880, Robertson married Emily Maud. Robertson purchased a medical practice in Ashwell, Hertfordshire in 1894. He became President of Ashwell Tennis Club and a member of the committee of the local cricket club.

He died suddenly at home in February 1900, aged 46.

== See also ==
- Alfred Clunies-Ross - the first non-white rugby union international player. He was capped by Scotland in the very first international match in 1871. Clunies-Ross was half-Malayan; a Cocos Malay. The Clunies-Ross family were Scots from the Cocos (Keeling) Islands; a previously uninhabited set of islands which they colonised along with Malayan workers.
- Andrew Watson (footballer, born 1856) - the first black person to play association football. Watson played for Maxwell, Parkgrove, and Queens Park before being capped for Scotland national football team.
- Robert Walker (Third Lanarkshire Rifle Volunteers footballer), another black player to play association football alongside Watson at Parkgrove.
