= John Halkett (colonial administrator) =

British Colonial Administrator

John Halkett (27 February 1768 – 12 November 1852) was Governor of the Bahamas and Governor of Tobago.

He was born in Pitfirrane, near Dunfermline, Scotland, the third son of Sir John Halkett, 4th Baronet and was educated at Glasgow University and the University of St Andrews. He was called to the Scottish bar in Edinburgh in August 1789.

From 1797 to 1801 he was secretary of presentations to his cousin Alexander Wedderburn, 1st Baron Loughborough, the Lord Chancellor of England. In 1801 he was appointed Governor of the Bahamas and in 1803 Governor of Tobago. On his return to London he was appointed first chief commissioner of West Indian accounts and became a major shareholder in the Hudson's Bay Company.

He was appointed a member of the Hudson's Bay Company London committee in November 1811 and supported the Red River Settlement project of his cousin, Lord Selkirk, writing a number of pamphlets on the poor treatment Selkirk had received from rival trading companies and the British Government. He visited Montreal and Red River in 1821 after Selkirk's death as executor of his will and on his return to London the following year published Historical notes respecting the Indians of North America: with remarks on the attempts made to convert and civilize them in which he recommended a more sympathetic approach to the native way of life and more respect for the native peoples of North America.

He retired in 1848 and died in 1852 at Brighton, leaving 4 sons from his second marriage to Selkirk's sister, Lady Katherine Douglas.

Political offices
| Preceded by William Dowdeswell | Governor of the Bahamas; 1801–1804 | Succeeded by Charles Cameron |
