= George Poyntz Ricketts =

Jamaican-born English plantation owner

George Poyntz Ricketts (1749 – 8 April 1800) was a Jamaican-born English plantation owner who became Governor of Tobago and Governor of Barbados.

He was born the son of Jacob Ricketts and Hannah Poyntz on the Midgham plantation, Jamaica (named after Midgham, Berkshire, the family seat of the Poyntz). He succeeded his father in 1756 to the plantation, which was sold to the Woolery/Woollery family c.1772. He married in 1774 Sophie Watts, whose sister Amelia was the mother of Robert Jenkinson, 2nd Earl of Liverpool, Prime Minister of Great Britain from 1812 to 1827. Ricketts also had mixed race half-siblings on Jamaica.

He was appointed Governor of Tobago in 1793. On Lord Liverpool's recommendation he was elevated to Governor of Barbados in 1794, a position he held until his resignation in 1800 because of ill health. He then returned to England and died in Liverpool later that year.

He and his wife had 4 sons and a daughter. Their son Charles Milner Ricketts was briefly MP for Dartmouth.

Government offices
Preceded by David Parry	Governor of Barbados; 1794–1800	Succeeded by Francis Humberston Mackenzie
Preceded by William Myers	Governor of Tobago; 1793–1794	Succeeded by William Lindsay
