= Thomas Lewis Ingram =

British merchant and colonial-era Governor of the Gambia (1807–1868)

Acting Governor of the Gambia
- In office 19 April 1847 – 22 December 1847
- Preceded by: Charles Fitzgerald
- Succeeded by: Richard Graves MacDonnell
- In office 1 March 1844 – 7 August 1844
- Preceded by: Edmund Nash Norcott
- Succeeded by: John Isles Mantell
- In office 26 August 1843 – 1 October 1843
- Preceded by: Henry Froude Seagram
- Succeeded by: Edmund Nash Norcott

Acting Lieutenant Governor of the Gambia
- In office 31 May 1841 – 1 April 1843
- Preceded by: Henry Vere Huntley
- Succeeded by: Henry Froude Seagram
- In office 17 September 1839 – 9 April 1840
- Preceded by: William Mackie
- Succeeded by: Henry Vere Huntley

Personal details
- Born: 1807 Dublin, Ireland
- Died: 1868 (aged 60–61)

Thomas Lewis Ingram (1807 – 1868) was a British merchant who served as the acting colonial governor of the Gambia on five occasions.

== Early life and education ==
Ingram was born in Dublin, Ireland, the son of a linen draper, and brought up in London. He first traveled to West Africa in 1822, working in Senegal as a shop boy before moving to Bathurst, the Gambia.

== Merchant and government career ==
Ingram initially worked in Bathurst for a British merchant, Edward Bocock. However, he soon entered colonial service as first writer in the colonial secretary's office in 1826. He returned to trade, initially with success, but by the early 1830s he had fallen into debt and returned to government employment. In April 1834, he was appointed as director of the Liberated Africans Department.

Following the yellow fever epidemic of April 1837, which killed George Rendall, the Lieutenant Governor, and Andrew Hunter, the Colonial Secretary, Anthony Clogstoun became the acting Lieutenant Governor. Clogstoun appointed Ingram as the acting Colonial Secretary. Ingram was also simultaneously appointed as the acting Queen's Advocate, due to the lack of European officials. When William Mackie, then-Lieutenant Governor, died in September 1839, Ingram became the acting Lieutenant Governor.

Ingram reverted to being Colonial Secretary when Henry Huntley arrived in April 1840 but took over government again when Huntley departed in May 1841. Ingram retained the post until the first Governor of the Gambia arrived in April 1843, Henry Seagram. Ingram became acting Governor after Seagram's death in August 1843, serving until Charles FitzGerald arrived in August 1844. During the early 1840s, Ingram clashed with British merchants in the Gambia, including Thomas Brown and John Hughes. Brown and Hughes accused Ingram of exerting official pressure on the courts through his younger brother, Alexander, who was a judge, and his friend, John Mantell, who was the Queen's Advocate.

Ingram was passed over as Governor proper by Richard Graves MacDonnell in 1847. His relationship with the governor frayed, and in 1849 he wrote to the Secretary of State for the Colonies, Earl Grey, to investigate MacDonnell's conduct. However, Grey dismissed him in September 1849 for mishandling public accounts, ending Ingram's public career. Rather than returning to England, Ingram stayed in the Gambia and turned to trade. However, on a visit to England in 1860, he was declared bankrupt. He returned to the Gambia, finally leaving in 1866. He died in 1868.

== Personal life and life ==
Ingram's younger brother, Alexander, joined the Gambian administration in the early 1840s, serving as Queen's Advocate, then Assistant Judge, then a clerk in the Customs Department, before drowning in 1849.

Ingram's son, Thomas Lewis Ingram, went on to have an illustrious legal career. He was appointed as Queen's Advocate and Police Magistrate in the Gambia in April 1863. He was called to the bar in England in 1867, and went on to serve as a successful barrister in West Africa and India. This Ingram had three children. The eldest, also named Thomas Lewis Ingram (1875-1916) was educated at Monkton Combe School together with his brothers George and James. He was a barrister of Middle Temple and in 1909 married Lilian Donnithorne. His third child was James Skinner Ingram, who also became a barrister of Middle Temple. In 1909, he married Loveday Isabel Donnithorne, the sister of Lilian. In 1912, his daughter, Victoria Catherine Ingram, married Harold Edward Donnithorne, the brother of Lilian and Loveday. Thomas Lewis Ingram, as a captain in the Royal Army Medical Corps, was killed in France on 16 September 1916. He had been awarded the Military Cross and the Distinguished Service Order.
