= Alexander Nicol Anton Waddell =

British colonial administrator

Sir Alexander Waddell KCMG DSC

4th Governor of Sarawak
- In office 23 February 1960 – 15 September 1963
- Monarch: Elizabeth II
- Preceded by: Anthony Abell
- Succeeded by: Office abolished

Personal details
- Born: 8 November 1913 Eassie, Angus, Scotland
- Died: 14 June 1999 (aged 85) Gloucestershire, England, United Kingdom
- Spouse: Jean Margot Lesbia Masters (m. 1949)
- Education: University of Edinburgh (MA)
- Profession: Diplomat
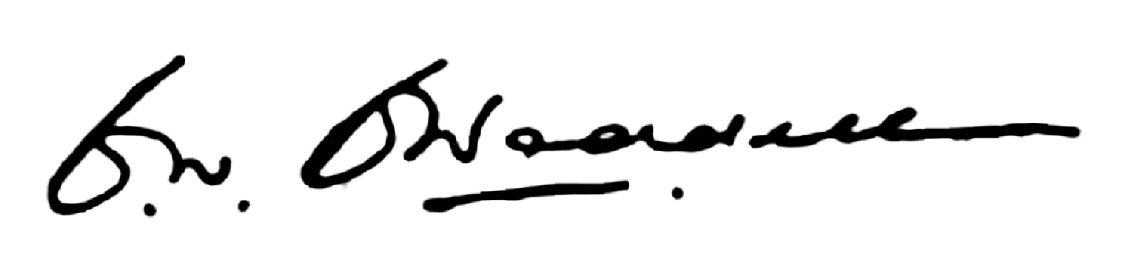
- Signature

Military service
- Branch/service: Royal Australian Navy
- Years of service: 1942–1944
- Rank: Lieutenant Colonel
- Unit: Royal Australian Naval Volunteer Reserve
- Battles/wars: World War II

Sir Alexander Nicol Anton Waddell KCMG DSC (8 November 1913 – 14 June 1999) was a British colonial administrator and governor who became the fourth Governor of Sarawak from 1960 to 1963, and Colonial Secretary of the Gambia from 1952 to 1957.

== Early life and education ==
Born on 8 November 1913 at Eassie, Angus, he was the youngest child of the Rev. Alexander Waddell, who was the Church of Scotland minister in Eassie for over 40 years. Waddell received his education at Dundee's Harris Academy, a scholarship to Edinburgh's Fettes College, and Edinburgh University, where he earned his M.A. He then attended Gonville and Caius College, Cambridge.

== Career ==
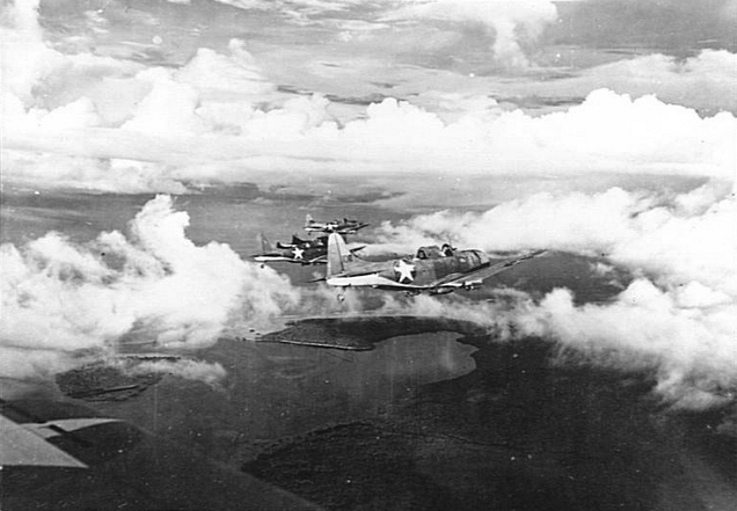
Sub-Lieutenant Alexander Waddell was positioned in the rear seat of the US Navy Douglas SBD Dauntless closest to the camera in 1944

Motivated by a missionary from Nyasaland residing in the manse, he enlisted in the Colonial Service as a cadet in 1937, and was assigned to the British Solomon Islands Protectorate (BSIP) as an administrative cadet. He joined the BSIP defense force in 1942 and held the rank of district officer until the following year. During the Second World War, he served as a Lieutenant in the Royal Australian Naval Volunteer Reserve for two years, from 1942 to 1944. Additionally, he served as a sub-lieutenant before becoming an acting Lieutenant in the Royal Australian Navy (RAN). He was initially attached to the U.S. Marine Raiders and subsequently performed intelligence work in the vicinity of Choiseul Island, which was under Japanese occupation. The USS Grampus (SS-207) landed him as a coastwatcher on the island of Choiseul, which is located in the Solomon Islands. In 1944, he was assigned to the Malayan Planning Unit under the War Office.

In 1945, he went back to the British Solomon Islands to serve as the Central Solomons District Commissioner. The next year, he served in Sarawak as a Lieutenant Colonel attached to the British Military Administration (BMA), spending several months in Simanggang. Among other locales he visited during that period were Saratok and Lingga. After that, he joined the Malayan Civil Service and served as Principal Assistant Secretary for North Borneo from 1947 to 1952. During that time, he also filled in as Deputy Chief Secretary on occasion. At North Borneo, he oversaw growth and the reconstruction of the country's crumbling economy.

=== Gambia ===
During his four years of service, Waddell was named Colonial Secretary of the Gambia in 1952. He served as Sierra Leone's Colonial Secretary from 1956 till obtaining his current position (later designated Deputy Governor). He witnessed constitutional amendments at this time that established an all-African Cabinet led by the Governor. After Ghana gained independence in 1957, he was instrumental in the reform of local administration and the creation of the constitution.

=== Governor of Sarawak ===
In a ceremony that took place in the Council Negri Chamber in Kuching on the afternoon of 23 February 1960, Waddell was sworn in as Sarawak's governor and commander-in-chief in 4:00 pm, Sir Alexander and Lady Waddell disembarked with the Private Secretary, G.T. Barnes from the Bentong onto the Astana barge in tow. They arrived in Pangkalan Batu. After inspecting the Guard of honour stationed in front of the Brooke Memorial, Sir Alexander—dressed in formal dress—was given a presentation by the Chief Secretary, along with several others. The Chief Justice administered the Oath of office and the Chief Secretary read the Commission appointing him in the Council Chamber.

Speaking in Malay during his installation, he made a name for himself fast by giving a thorough tour of the interior and demonstrating the warmth of the hospitality that he and his wife, Jean, provided at The Astana, Rajah Brooke's former residence. Politically, it was a challenging period. The decision to include North Borneo and Brunei into Malaya instead of federate them infuriated Indonesia, sparking the Indonesia-Malaysia confrontation.

== Later life ==
From 1965 to 1977, Waddell served as the United Kingdom Commissioner for the British Phosphate Commissioners. Along with commissioners from New Zealand and Australia, he oversaw the exploitation of islands rich in phosphate found in the Pacific and Indian Oceans. Banaba in the Gilbert Islands, was one of these islands. After phosphate was depleted, he vigorously campaigned for the recognition of the moral right of the Banabans, who had been uprooted and transferred to Fiji in the 1930s, to receive food.

In the middle of the 1970s, the long-running and bitter issue ultimately made its way to the London High Court, where the Banabans' action against the commissioners (Tito v. Waddell) set a new record for the length of 106 days in civil proceedings. While not much was resolved at the time, Waddell's cordial connections and empathy contributed to the Banabans' inclusion in independent Kiribati (which became the Gilbert Islands in 1979). From 1979 to 1985, he was a member of the Department of the Environment's Panel of Independent Inspectors. On 14 June 1999, he died at Gloucestershire in England at the age of 85.

== Honours ==
During World War II in 1944, Waddell got the Distinguished Service Cross and was welcomed by the Queen Elizabeth (now Queen mother) at Buckingham Palace upon his return to the United Kingdom. In June 1959, it was declared that he had been awarded the C.M.G. and later promoted to Order of St Michael and St George (K.C.M.G.). Known honours awarded to him are:

- Knight Commander of the Order of St Michael and St George (KCMG) – Sir; Companion (CMG; June 1959)
- Distinguished Service Cross (DSC; 1944)

Government offices
Preceded by Sir Anthony Abell	Governor of Sarawak; 1960–1963	Succeeded by Office abolished
Preceded by Edward R. Ward	Colonial Secretary of the Gambia; 1952–1956	Succeeded by Kenneth G.S. Smith
