= Anthony Browne Johnston Clogstoun =

Anthony Browne Johnston Clogstoun (1815 – 15 January 1851) was acting lieutenant governor of the Gambia from 1837 to September 1838 and later served as Marshal of Trinidad until his death.

== Family ==
He was the eldest son of Samuel Matthew Clogstoun and Caroline Jane Walcott, whose estate led to the chancery case Clogstoun v Walcott. His brother was Victoria Cross recipient Herbert Mackworth Clogstoun. Clogstoun married Georgina Woodford Warner in 1840, having children including Herbert Frederick Clogstoun and Caroline Augusta Clogstoun.
