= Gaspard Théodore Mollien =

French diplomat and explorer

Gaspard Théodore Mollien (29 August 1796, in Paris – 28 June 1872, in Nice) was a French diplomat and explorer.

In July 1816, as a passenger aboard the Medusa en route to Saint-Louis, Senegal, he became shipwrecked to the south of Cap Blanc. He survived the ordeal, and eventually made his way to Gorée Island, where he worked as a hospital manager.

In 1817 he explored Cap-Vert (Senegal) and traveled the Senegal River. During the following year he was tasked by the colonial governor to recognize the sources of the Senegal and Gambia rivers. In 1819 he was awarded the Cross of the Legion of Honor for his African exploits.

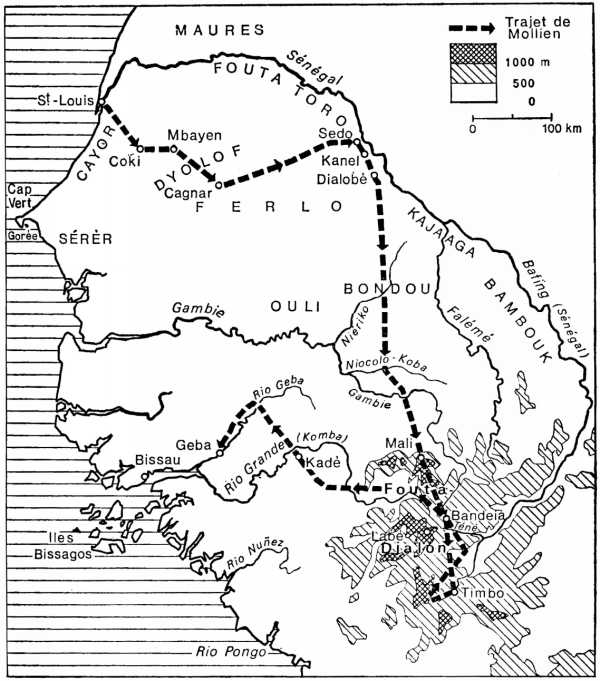
Chart of Mollien's route in western Africa.

Beginning in 1822 he was stationed in Colombia, then in Haiti, where in 1828 he was named consul; from 1831 to 1848 he served as consul in Havana, Cuba.

== Publications ==
- (in French) Voyage dans l’intérieur de l’Afrique, aux sources du Sénégal et de la Gambie, fait en 1818, par ordre du gouvernement français. Paris: Mme Ve Courcier, 1820. Online at Harvard's Mirador Viewer
  - Travels in the interior of Africa, to the sources of the Senegal and Gambia: performed by command of the French Government, in the year 1818. Translated by Thomas Edward Bowdich. London: Henry Colburn & Co., 1820.
- (in French) Découverte des sources du Sénégal et de la Gambie en 1818 : précédée d'un récit inédit du naufrage de la Méduse (1889) – Discovery of the sources of the Senegal and Gambia in 1818, preceded by an unpublished account of the wreck of the Medusa.
- (in French) Voyage dans la République de Colombia, en 1823 1824.
  - Travels in the Republic of Colombia : in the years 1822 and 1823, translated into English; London; C. Knight, 1824.
- (in French) Mœurs d'Haïti : précédé du Naufrage de la Méduse (introduction by Francis Arzalie).
