= Alfred Clunies-Ross =

Scotland international rugby union player

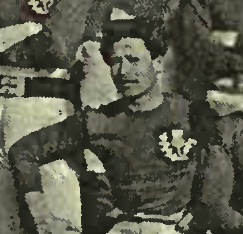
- Born: Alfred Clunies-Ross circa 1851 Cocos Islands
- Died: 28 February 1903 (aged 51–52) Cocos Islands
- School: Madras College
- University: St Andrew's University
- Notable relative(s): George Clunies-Ross, King of the Cocos Islands

Rugby union career
- Position: Fullback
Amateur team(s)
Years	Team	Apps	(Points)
- University of St Andrews RFC
–	Edinburgh Wanderers		
–	St. George's Hospital		
–	London Wasps		
International career
Years	Team	Apps	(Points)
1871	Scotland	1	(0)

Alfred Clunies-Ross (c.1851 – 28 February 1903) was a rugby union international who represented Scotland in the first international rugby match in 1871.

Clunies-Ross, a Cocos Malay from a Scots family, was the first non-white rugby union international player.

== Early life ==
Alfred was born around 1851 in the Cocos Islands. Of mixed Indo origin, the son of John George Clunies-Ross and S'pia Dupong from Surakarta, his father was second ruler-proprietor of the Cocos Islands, referred to by the press as the King of those islands. His elder brother George became the third ruler-proprietor of the islands. The Clunies-Ross family had originated in the Shetland Islands and both Alfred and his brothers had been sent to Scotland for education. Alfred attended Madras College. There he excelled at sport. In a report found in the "St Andrews Gazette" of a cricket match played between St Andrews University and Madras College in March 1864 (in which Madras were victorious by 21 runs), the following is written about Alfred: "the very clever hitting and fielding of Affie Ross, a lively and smart little fellow, to all appearances not yet reached his teens". Another reference is made of his playing a football fixture on 9 January 1869 at the Baxter Park, Dundee against Aberdeen University. His brother Alex was also in the team, and Alfred is referred to at this point as Alf Ross. He went on to study medicine in Edinburgh.

== Rugby union career ==
Alfred played for the University of St Andrews and such was his prowess he was selected to play in the first international rugby match in 1871 between Scotland and England. This was played on 27 March 1871 at Raeburn Place, Edinburgh and won by Scotland. After he moved to London, he was at St George's Hospital until 1873 and subsequently played for the London Wasps from 1874 to 1880.

== Career and personal life ==
Alfred left St Andrews University for London in around 1872, before graduating. Although he then worked at St George's Hospital in London in 1873 he still did not attain a medical degree, as confirmed in 1885 when E.W. Birch in his government report wrote of Alfred: "He was a medical student but did not graduate." Birch went on: "He lives at the Cocos and is the doctor of the place. He is a bachelor, an exceedingly well-informed man, talks well on most subjects, and is very popular with the natives. He is an excellent carpenter." Alfred later married his cousin Ellen at Cocos in 1886 and they had 5 children, among whom were Ellen and Cosmo. In 1888 it is known that Alfred went to work in North Borneo. Of his later years, it is known that in 1901 he became seriously ill and moved to Singapore. Having not recovered from the illness he returned to Cocos to recuperate in 1902 but died in 1903.

== See also ==
- James Robertson (rugby union, born 1854) - the first known black rugby union player. He played for Royal HSFP and Edinburgh District in the early 1870s.
- Andrew Watson (footballer, born 1856) - the first black person to play association football. Watson played for Maxwell, Parkgrove, and Queens Park before being capped for Scotland national football team.
- Robert Walker (Third Lanarkshire Rifle Volunteers footballer), another black player to play association football alongside Watson at Parkgrove.
