= George Rendall =

Lieutenant Governor of the Gambia

George Rendall (c. 1791 — 20 September 1837) was the Lieutenant Governor of the Gambia, from 3 April 1830 to 20 September 1837. He was formerly the acting Chief Justice of Sierra Leone.
