= Henry Froude Seagram =

Henry Froude Seagram (c. July 1802 – 26 August 1843) was Lieutenant Governor of the Gambia from January 1843 and Governor from June 1843 to 26 August 1843, when he died there of fever. Later, however, from 1866 to 1888, The Gambia was again administered under the colony of Sierra Leone. He is memorialised in St Michael's Church, Aldbourne, Wiltshire.

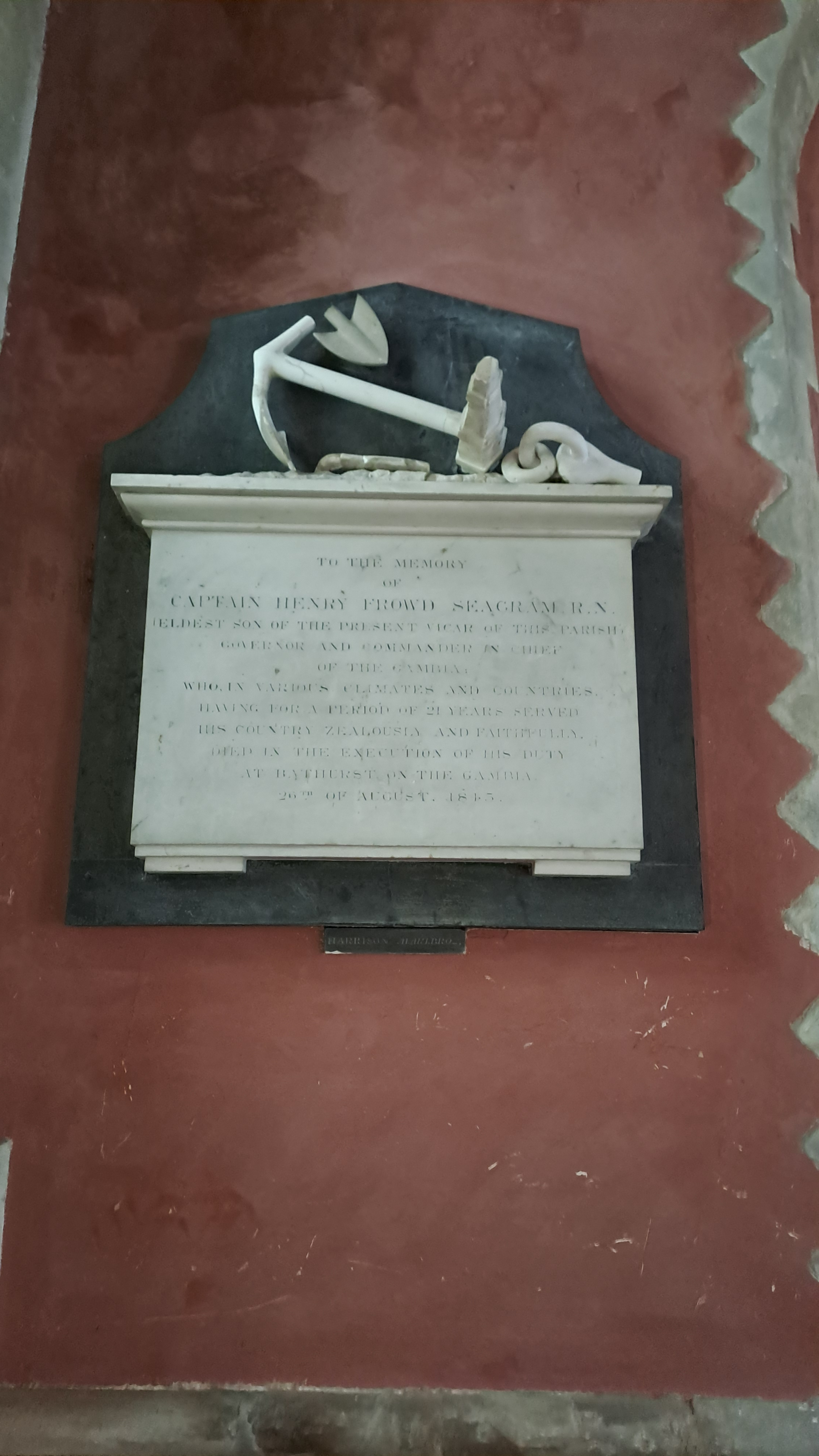
Memorial stone in St Michael's Church, Aldbourne, to Henry Froude Seagram.
