= Lau King Howe Hospital Memorial Museum =

Museum in Sibu, Sawarak, Malaysia

- Muzium Memorial Hospital Lau King Howe
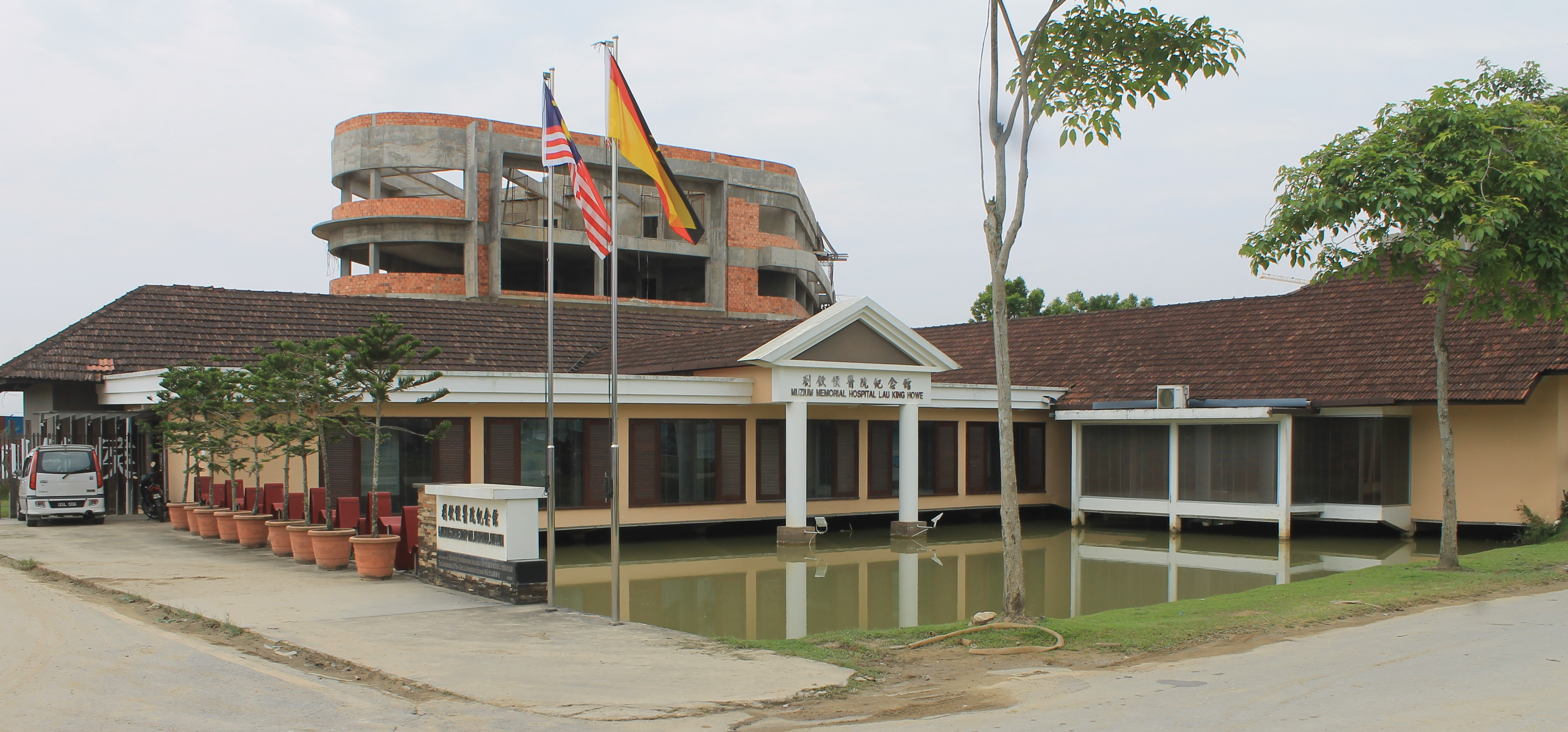
- Established: 3 August 1996
- Location: Sibu, Sarawak, Malaysia
- Coordinates: 2°17′28.3″N 111°49′18.4″E
- Type: medical museum
- Website: Official website

The Lau King Howe Hospital Memorial Museum (Malay: Muzium Memorial Hospital Lau King Howe) (Chinese : 劉欽侯醫院紀念館) is a medical museum in Sibu, Sarawak, Malaysia. The museum is the first and only medical museum in Malaysia.

== History ==
Lau King Howe Hospital was built in 1936 by Mr Lau King Howe as the only hospital in Sibu after an approval of funds and land from the Brooke government. However, soon after the hospital was built, Mr Lau returned to China. The hospital had 400 beds and an outpatient department in 1986.

After the Sibu Hospital was opened on 1 September 1994, less patients visited the hospital. Eventually, the hospital buildings were demolished in 1994 and the site converted into a commercial lot. A small museum named after the hospital at a cost of MYR450,000 was built near the original “entrance” to the hospital. It was officially opened on 3 August 1996.

== See also ==
- List of museums in Malaysia
- List of tourist attractions in Malaysia
