= Thomas Kerr (governor) =

Governor of the Falkland Islands

Thomas Kerr, CMG (1818 – August 1907) was Governor of the Falkland Islands from 1880 to 1891.
