= Henry Darling =

British Army general

Major-General Henry Charles Darling (Uppingham, 28 February 1780 – 11 February 1845) was a Major General in the British Army and colonial administrator. He followed his father to enlist in the 45th (1st Nottinghamshire) Regiment and went on to serve in the Nova Scotia Fencibles. He enjoyed the patronage of his brother Ralph Darling and became military secretary to George Ramsay, 9th Earl of Dalhousie, the Governor General of British North America. He later became a superintendent with the British Indian Department and, from 1833 to 1845, was Lieutenant Governor of Tobago.

== Early life ==
Darling was the son of Christopher Darling, a sergeant and quartermaster officer in the British Army's 45th (1st Nottinghamshire) Regiment, originally from Durham. Henry Darling spent some of his childhood in the West Indies, where his father was posted from 1785. Henry Darling's brother, Ralph Darling, served as Governor of New South Wales from 1825 to 1831. Both brothers enlisted in the 45th Regiment as privates, Henry Darling joining at the age of 14. Ralph rose rapidly, enjoying the patronage of Prince Frederick, Duke of York and Albany and helped to obtain positions for his brother.

== Military and colonial career ==
Henry Darling served with the 45th Regiment in the West Indies and then with the Nova Scotia Fencibles during the Napoleonic Wars. He went on half pay at the end of the war before finding employment, in 1820, as military secretary to George Ramsay, 9th Earl of Dalhousie, the Governor General of British North America. From 1826 he was a superintendent with the British Indian Department. Darling was Lieutenant Governor of Tobago from 1833 to 1845.

== Personal life ==
Darling was a Tory and an imperialist. Darling married Isabella, the daughter Charles Cameron, a banker and governor of the Bahamas from 1804 to 1820. Their son, Charles Henry Darling, was also a soldier and colonial administrator and went on to become Governor of Jamaica and of Victoria (Australia). Darling died on 11 February 1845.

Government offices
Preceded by Alexander Gardner	Lieutenant Governor of Tobago; 1833 – 1845	Succeeded by Laurence Graeme
