= George Abbas Kooli D'Arcy =

Governor of Gambia and Falkland Islands

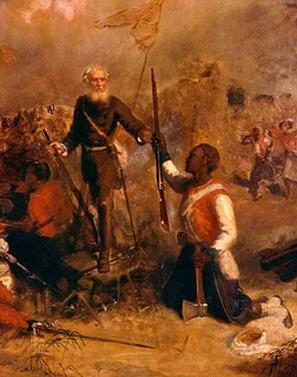
Detail of 'The Capture of Tubabakalong, Gambia 1866' by Louis William Desanges

George Abbas Kooli D'Arcy (30 July 1818 – 22 October 1885) was a British soldier and colonial administrator. He was governor of the Gambia from 1859 to 1866, and governor of the Falkland Islands from 1870 to 1876.

== Early life ==
D'Arcy was born in London, the son of Lt Col Joseph D'Arcy and Lady Catherine Georgiana West (daughter of the 4th Earl De La Warr). D'Arcy's father was a Major (25/11/1813) in the Royal Artillery who arrived in Persia in with the Ambassador, Sir Gore Ouseley, to reform and equip the Persian Army, the British Mission to Herat, and as a result D'Arcy was named in honour of the Shah of Persia. The Shah had requested that Joseph name his eldest son after him. Joseph being of modest mind named the child Abbas Kooli, not liking to take the title of the Shah as well as the name "Khan" signifying Highness, whereas "Kooli" meant ordinary.

== Career ==
D'Arcy became a Colonel in the 3rd West India Regiment. In 1859, he was appointed governor of The Gambia. A yellow fever epidemic was raging when D'Arcy arrived in Bathurst in September 1859, but his appeals for extra funding to improve sanitation in the colony were unsuccessful.

D'Arcy led a military expedition against the kingdom of Baddibu in 1861, thereby precipitating the rise to power of Ma Bah Diakhou, with whom D'Arcy was forced to sign a friendship treaty in February 1863. D'Arcy's efforts to improve the condition of the Liberated Africans in Bathurst were undermined by local merchants and some members of his own administration. Several Liberated Africans signed a petition in 1864 calling for his governorship to be extended, though by 1865 he was less popular with them.

In 1866, Lieutenant Colonel George D'Arcy, commanding officer of the 3rd West India Regiment and Governor of the Gambia, marched to confront a rebellious Marabout leader named Amar Faal at Tubabakolong (also known as Tubab Kolon), a stockaded town on the river's northern bank. The garrison unit in Bathurst at that time was the 4th West India Regiment. Lt-Col. D'Arcy led 270 officers and men of that battalion together with around 500 warriors from the Soninke tribe to Tubabakolong, attacking the town on 30 June. During the assault by 18 soldiers on a fortified gateway Private Samuel Hodge aided D'Arcy in an assault on it after the rest of the force were dead and was awarded the Victoria Cross for his bravery.

In the 1866 reorganization of the British West African Settlements, D'Arcy was removed as governor, though he stayed on as administrator until Charles Patey arrived in December 1866.

From 1870 to 1876 D'Arcy was governor of the Falkland Islands. He retired to Penzance in Cornwall and died in Plymouth, Devon, aged 67.

Government offices
Preceded by Luke Smythe O'Connor	Governor of the Gambia; 1859–1866	Succeeded by Charles George Edward Patey as Administrator of The Gambia
