= Alexander Bravo =

Jamaican merchant, politician and planter

Alexander Bravo (1797 – March 1868), sometimes spelled Alexandre Bravo, was a Jamaican merchant, politician and planter who served as Auditor-General of Jamaica. Bravo was the first Jew to be elected to the House of Assembly of Jamaica.

== Biography ==
Alexandre Moses Bravo was born at Kingston, St. Andrew Parish, Jamaica to Moses Bravo (1758–1831), a Sephardic Jewish merchant and slave plantation owner in Jamaica (dealing with sugar cane and coffee) and his wife Abigail da Castro. Alexander Bravo was seated at a villa named Bravo Penn. He was a member of the Kingston Common Council and Custos of the parish of Clarendon. He had three brothers, including Charles Clement and Phineas Bravo.

According to the Legacies of British Slave-Ownership at the University College London, Bravo was awarded a payment as a slave trader in the aftermath of the Slavery Abolition Act 1833 with the Slave Compensation Act 1837. The British Government took out a £15 million loan (worth £1.54 billion in 2025) with interest from Nathan Mayer Rothschild and Moses Montefiore which was subsequently paid off by the British taxpayers (ending in 2015). Bravo was associated with ten different claims, the slave plantations mostly associated with Bravo was Knight's Estate at Vere, Marly Mount at St Dorothy and Mount Moses at Clarendon. Bravo owned 614 slaves in Jamaica and received a £13,157 payment at the time (worth £1.35 million in 2025).

Bravo was defeated at the January 1832 election for the Kingston Common Council by Price Watkins, the first coloured man to run for election to the council. According to Kathleen E. A. Monteith writing in Jamaica in Slavery and Freedom: History, Heritage and Culture (2001), the election results represented an alliance of free blacks and coloureds in alliance against Bravo; the result was 142 to Watkins, 92 to Bravo. In 1835, Bravo became the first Jew to be elected to the House of Assembly of Jamaica.

== Personal life ==
Bravo was married to Sarah Nunes Henriques and had a number of children, including Moses (1825–1903), Alexandre Kelly (born 1829), Harriet Redware (1830–1920) and others.

== See also ==
- History of the Jews in Jamaica
