= Charles Rufus Marshall Workman =

British colonial administrator

- Born: 1874; Dulwich, Surrey, England
- Died: 28 June 1942 (aged 67–68); Grasby, Lincolnshire, England

Charles Rufus Marshall Workman, CBE (1874 – 28 June 1942) was a British colonial administrator. He was the first civilian administrator of Nauru after its conquest by Australian forces in 1914. He was acting Resident Commissioner of the Solomon Islands from 1917 to 1919 and Resident Commissioner of the Solomon Islands from 1919 to 1921. From 1921 until his retirement in 1931, he was Colonial Secretary of The Gambia.

Workman was appointed a Commander of the Order of the British Empire (CBE) in the 1927 Birthday Honours.
