= Herbert Henniker-Heaton =

British colonial administrator

Governor of the Falkland Islands, Governor of Bermuda

Personal details
- Born: 9 February 1880 New South Wales, Australia
- Died: 24 January 1961 (aged 80) Hove, Sussex
- Occupation: Diplomat and colonial administrator

Sir Herbert Henniker Heaton, KCMG (9 February 1880 – 24 January 1961) was a British colonial administrator. (Note: Sources spell his name both with and without the hyphen.) He was Governor of the Falkland Islands from 1935 to 1941.

== Early life and career ==
The third son of Sir John Henniker Heaton, Bt., Herbert Henniker-Heaton was educated at Eton College and New College, Oxford. He entered the Colonial Service in 1902, being posted to Fiji as a cadet for his first posting. In 1913, he was appointed Assistant Colonial Secretary, Mauritius, and in 1917 Colonial Secretary, Gambia.

== Colonial governor ==
Henniker-Heaton arrived at Stanley to take up his post as colonial secretary for the Falklands (and acting governor in the absence of an appointed governor) on the liner Orcoma on 12 September 1921. During his time as acting governor Henniker-Heaton had a work on sheep-farming on the islands published in 1923. In 1924 Henniker-Heaton had a new crest commissioned for the Falklands from the visiting Irish artist Conor O'Brien, which was officially adopted in 1925 and remained in use until 1948, and is still used by the Falkland Islands Defence Force. Henniker-Heaton left to take up a post as governor of Bermuda in 1925, and subsequently served as governor of Cyprus, before being appointed again as governor of the Falklands in 1935.

As a response to the Great Depression, Henniker-Heaton proposed radical land-reform, including the sub-division of farms larger than 24,000 acres, freeing up land for use by Falkland Islanders and refugees from Europe. The plan was not backed by London and hence was not put into place. Henniker-Heaton was also instrumental in efforts to save the hulk of the SS Great Britain, then moored in poor state at Stanley, by beaching her on a nearby cove such that she could later be recovered for preservation.

Henniker-Heaton submitted his resignation from the colonial service in 1939, dated to be effective in February 1940 when he was to turn 60 years old. However he withdrew his resignation with the outbreak of war in Europe. Henniker-Heaton finally left the Falklands in 1941, finishing his career as an acting Colonial Secretary in Bermuda.

== Personal life ==
Henniker-Heaton was first married in 1909, to Phoebe Talbot-Crosbie from Ardfert, County Kerry with whom he had two daughters and two sons. Phoebe died during the couple's first year in the Falklands whilst giving birth to their son Dermot, and is buried in the graveyard at Stanley. In 1926 he married Helena Iris McCallum, who died the next year during childbirth, giving birth to the couple's son Christopher. Henniker-Heaton's third and final marriage was in 1947 to Gladys Going, a widow. Henniker-Heaton died in Hove, Sussex in 1961.

== Honours ==
Henniker-Heaton was appointed a Companion of the Order of St Michael and St George (CMG) in the 1928 Birthday Honours, and promoted to Knight Commander of the Order (KCMG) in 1937.
