= Robert Baxter Llewelyn =

Colonial administrator (1845–1919)

Sir Robert Baxter Llewelyn KCMG (1845–1919) was a colonial administrator in the British Empire.

== Appointments ==
- 1878-1883: Commissioner of the Turks and Caicos Islands
- 1885-1888: Governor of Tobago
- 1886-1889: Administrator of Saint Vincent and the Grenadines
- 1889-1891: Commissioner of Saint Lucia
- 1891-1900: Administrator of the Colony of the Gambia
- 7 November 1900 – 1906: Governor and Commander-in-Chief of the Windward Islands and their dependencies
- 1900-1906: Governor of Grenada

During his time as the Governor of the Windward Isles Llewelyn oversaw the response to the 1902 eruption of La Soufriere Volcano on St. Vincent. On the morning of the climactic eruption he left the island of St. Vincent (his usual residence) for a meeting in St. Lucia, but made some observations of activity as his ship sailed past, and later returned. This impacted trust in his governance around recovery and response to further explosions. He later returned £33,000 of the £77,000 raised for relief efforts as decision-making around this was slow and acrimonious. The needs of the refugee populations were not met, and many were encouraged to move overseas for employment.
