= Malay National Union of Sarawak =

Community organisation in Sarawak, Malaysia

- Persatuan Kebangsaan Melayu Sarawak
- Abbreviation: MNUS/PKMS
- Formation: October 10, 1939; 87 years ago
- Founded at: Kuching, Raj of Sarawak
- Type: Malay community organisation
- Headquarters: Kuching, Sarawak, Malaysia
- Region served: Sarawak
- Formerly called: Persatuan Melayu Sarawak

The Malay National Union of Sarawak (MNUS; Malay: Persatuan Kebangsaan Melayu Sarawak, PKMS) is a community organisation in Sarawak, Malaysia. Headquartered in Kuching, the organisation was established to promote the advancement of Sarawakian Malays.

MNUS was founded in 1939, at a time when Kuching was the capital of the Raj of Sarawak. Its creation reflected social change within Sarawak, including a growing and increasingly connected middle class, as well as regional trends that saw the creation of ethnic Malay societies and similar community organisations elsewhere. The founding of MNUS represented a compromise between its more middle class initiators and traditional Malay elites. It sought to promote the development of the Sarawakian Malay community, support Malay culture and Islam, and represent their community before the White Rajah government.

The activities of the organisation were suppressed during the Japanese occupation of British Borneo. Following liberation, plans emerged for Sarawak to be ceded to the United Kingdom. MNUS became a prominent part of what became known as the anti-cession movement, which advocated for the return of a White Rajah and the restoration of Sarawak's self-government. After this campaign failed, MNUS returned to the role of being a social and cultural organisation.

== History ==
=== Foundation and early activities ===
The creation of the Raj of Sarawak under the White Rajahs led to the introduction of new ideas and social developments. One innovation was the development of social groups defined by interest, rather than by kinship. Westerners established groups such as the Sarawak Club, and over time, membership of these social clubs became open to those of Chinese and Malay ethnicities. Members of the Sarawakian Malay community began to establish their own societies; many early groups developed around sports. The creation of such clubs faced some opposition from traditionalists. These organisations created social structures outside of traditional hierarchies. The success of sports clubs may have contributed to the formation of other clubs, including more purely social ones. The earliest of these may have been the 1936 Persatuan Melayu Miri (Miri Malay Association).

Around this time, Malay political groups were being formed in British Malaya. This may have influenced the establishment of Malay community organisations in Sarawak due to sociocultural connections between the two regions. These connections included shared newspapers such as the Jawi Peranakan, Sarawakian Malays studying in the peninsula, and social organisations with members in both regions. Nationalist movements were also emerging in neighbouring Indonesia, with an early similar group being the Sarekat Islam organisation.

The founding of MNUS was the idea of Rakawi Yusuf. Yusuf had connections with organisations in Malaya and Singapore. However, he was not a member of the Perabangan upper class of Malays in Sarawak, and had no influence within the Sarawak government. His social activism was viewed by these groups with caution. Interested individuals began to meet from 1937, although due to opposition from traditional leaders, no formal society was created at this time. Reportedly, 40 of the 72 attendees of the original meeting left due to this opposition. Following negotiations, the acceptance of the Perabangan traditional leaders was achieved in part due to the society accepting Abang Haji Abdillah as a benefactor, and Abang Sulaiman as president. Yusuf helped draft the MNUS' constitution, although he died before the organisation was formally registered on 10 October 1939. The society was initially named Persatuan Melayu Sarawak, with Kebangsaan added later. Due to the agreement between its initiators and the Perabangan, MNUS presented a united front between traditional leaders and the growing middle class. Other initial officials were Vice-Presidents Kawi bin Saed, Abdul Rahman bin Kassim, Ali bin Hossen, and Bolhassan bin Daud, Secretary-General Johari bin Anang, and Treasurer Abang Mohammad Daim.

MNUS had four primary aims: uniting and helping improve the lives of the Malay community, promoting Malay economic interests and culture, supporting Islam, and representing the Malay community before the government. Early efforts were funded through a loan from the Kwong Lee Bank. Soon after MNUS' foundation, community donations allowed this loan to be repaid, and further, funded the establishment of an office and religious school. As a symbol of their cooperative attitude towards the government, MNUS actively participated in the 1941 Sarawak Centenary celebrations.

=== Anti-cession movement ===
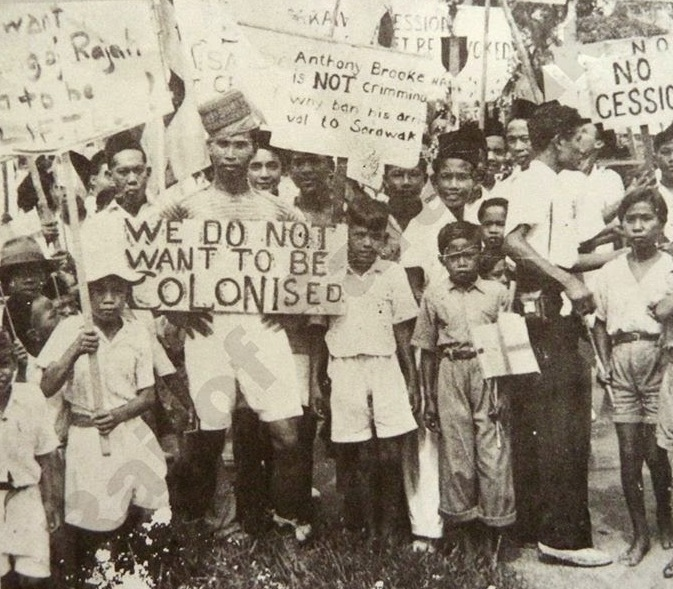
The Malay National Union of Sarawak was a prominent component of the anti-cession movement of Sarawak.

Following the Japanese occupation of British Borneo, Japanese authorities viewed MNUS as a political group and suppressed its activities. As Borneo was liberated, it emerged that the United Kingdom had made plans for Sarawak to become a British colony. MNUS became a vocal opponent of this plan. The number of members at this time is unclear; possible membership numbers range from a few hundred to around 7,800. These numbers were politically significant, as British officials gave various views of how representative MNUS was of the roughly 125,000-strong Sarawakian Malay community. Local branches were established outside of Kuching, with at least 20 being founded by 1950 (including one in Brunei).

Sarawak was provisionally ceded to the United Kingdom by Rajah Charles Vyner Brooke on 1 July 1945. MNUS became a key part of the anti-cession movement that sought a return of the White Rajahs and the restoration of Sarawak's independence. MNUS' women's wing became a prominent part of the anti-cession movement. MNUS argued that the cession violated the 1941 constitution of Sarawak and its provisions for self-government. They also campaigned on the self-determination principles of the Atlantic Charter.

Abang Sulaiman came out in support of cession, and so was replaced as president by Abang Haji Zaini on 27 February 1946. Abang Haji Abdillah remained opposed to cession. On 20 April 1946, Charles Vyner Brooke wrote to MNUS, expressing his view that cession was required for Sarawak to recover economically from the war. On 8 May, Abang Haji Zaini wrote to Bertram Brooke, the Tuan Muda of Sarawak, to oppose the cession. Abang Haji Abdillah boycotted the cession ceremony on 1 July 1946, when Sarawak officially became the Crown Colony of Sarawak. That day, Abang Haji Abdillah and Abang Haji Zaini wrote to British Prime Minister Clement Attlee in protest. The Malay community also engaged in boycotts of official government visits to other towns and villages. As the Sarawak Mufti supported cession, anti-cessionists boycotted the Masjid Besar, praying instead at the Indian Mosque and elsewhere. Abang Haji Abdillah on 26 July again wrote to Bertram Brooke, requesting Brooke seek the support of the United Nations or the United States. He wrote again in November seeking a meeting, but died later that month.

After the new government of Governor Charles Arden-Clarke issued Circular No. 9 on 10 December 1946, which required civil servants to support the new government and eschew politics, MNUS launched a campaign which led to over 400 Malay civil servants resigning. Included among these were 87 of Sarawak's 152 teachers. Clarke blamed these resignations on disinformation, an assertion openly disputed by MNUS. There are some records that MNUS may have pressured Malays for financial support. MNUS leaders campaigned to remove the ban on Anthony Brooke returning to Sarawak, and met with Anthony Brooke in Singapore. Protests in Sarawak called for Anthony Brooke to be declared Rajah alongside the restoration of Sarawak's former protectorate status. On Anthony Brooke's birthday on 10 December 1947, MNUS organised a 3,000-person parade to protest British rule. This parade involved only Malays and included roughly equal numbers of men and women. On 8 March 1948, Johari bin Anang organised a demonstration in Kuching that involved members of other organisations in addition to MNUS.

The anti-cession movement expanded outside of MNUS through the foundation of new societies, generally including Malays and other bumiputera. These emerged in the main towns and in rural areas. The new groups had various personal and formal relationships with MNUS. Many were youth-run, as MNUS was viewed as being controlled by older generations. Divides grew within the Malay community between pro- and anti-cession groups. This led to the establishment of groups ostensibly aiming to bridge this divide. One such group, the Young Malay Association, favoured cession and received financial support from Charles Vyner Brooke. MNUS continued to protest, noting in its messages that its mission was not anti-British, and that the United Kingdom was still welcome as a protector. MNUS also noted that it sought change peacefully and with regards to the law. The 10th anniversary of MNUS' founding was celebrated on 10 October 1949, amid continued anti-cession actions and news of the replacement of Clarke as Governor by Duncan Stewart. This period coincided with a lack of communication with Anthony Brooke, who had launched a legal case regarding the cession that was at the time before the Privy Council.

The anti-cession movement developed alongside the growth of groups seeking to incorporate Sarawak into Indonesia, although what links existed between these movements, and to what extent, is unclear. Some anti-cession groups adopted more extreme tactics. This included Rukun 13, whose members planned assassinations against British officials and Malays viewed as British collaborators. On 3 December 1949, a member of Rukun 13 stabbed Stewart, who died a week later. The government responded by cracking down on the anti-cession movement, bringing new scrutiny to the activity of Malay societies. Support for anti-cession faltered, with the assassination raising significant opposition in other ethnic communities. Some Malay anti-cession groups issued letters of condolence.

MNUS continued to campaign following the assassination. However, activities among anti-cession groups declined, and public demonstrations diminished. An issue of the Utusan Sarawak newspaper from 22 June 1950 was notable for its lack of anti-cession material. With legal avenues exhausted, in 1951 Anthony Brooke issued a statement calling for the end of the movement. MNUS shifted back towards its original focus of being a voice for the Sarawakian Malay community.

=== Later history ===
Malay societies in Sarawak would only begin to re-engage with politics after the establishment of Chinese political organisations. The creation of the first Sarawakian political party, the Sarawak United Peoples' Party (SUPP), in 1959 was viewed skeptically by MNUS. While the SUPP aimed to be inclusive, MNUS preferred the concept of ethnically-based political parties, following the model established in Malaya.

In 2023, MNUS began the process of building a new headquarters on land the organisation owned in Kuching. MNUS continues to seek to document and share Sarawakian Malay cultural heritage.
