= Eberwein =

Eberwein is a surname. Notable people with the surname include:

- Carl Eberwein (1786–1868), German composer and violinist
- Jürgen Eberwein, German figure skater
- Lily Eberwein (1900–1980), Sarawakian nationalist and women's right activist
- Michael Eberwein (born 1996), German footballer
