= Lily Eberwein =

Sarawakian nationalist and women's right activist (1900–1980)

Lily Eberwein Abdullah (11 July 1900 – 1980) was a Sarawakian nationalist and a women's rights activist. She was politically active in the anti-cession movement of Sarawak, a nationalist movement in the 1940s attempted to retrieve Sarawak's independence from takeover by Britain. This movement had helped in politicising local people besides cultivating national spirit in people of Sarawak.

== Biography ==
=== Early life ===
Lily Eberwein Abdullah was a Eurasian by birth, having European and Malay ancestry. Her father, John Eberwein, a Eurasian of Dutch and Scottish descent from Cocos Islands, was a relative of the Clunies-Ross family, rulers of that island. Lily's father captained the ship Rajah Brooke for the Straits Steamship Company. Her mother was a local Malay woman, Maznah bt. Ali bin Alang of Simanggang. They lived in Singapore where they had two children, Lily and Edward. Maznah was a practising Muslim, but Lily and Edward had a Christian upbringing. Lily had her early education at St. Mary's Mission School in Kuching, Sarawak until she was eight years old and continued her study at Raffles Girls’ School in Singapore.

=== Conversion to Islam ===
After her father's death, Lily returned to Kuching with her mother and continued her study until Standard Seven (equivalent to Form Three, age 15) at St. Mary's Mission School. Her father's death completely changed her family's lifestyle. Lily had to adjust to a Muslim Malay upbringing, denoted by the addition of Abdullah to her name. In an interview, her daughter, Hafsah Harun, explained that her mother's upbringing was different from that of other Malay girls. Having had a European lifestyle in Singapore, when she returned to Kuching she missed her previous freedom and found it difficult to start covering her head and be confined to the house. She had been accustomed to having male servants to serve her when her father was still alive in Singapore, but back in Kuching she had to serve her uncles. Furthermore, being an educated woman she was very outspoken and independent. Lily converted to Islam in 1913. Her knowledge about her new religion impressed her neighbours, to the extent that many people in the village sent their sons to Lily to learn to read the Quran. This gesture showed that the people in the village trusted her and respected her highly as women were rarely consulted for religious teaching in that era. She had become accepted, and identified herself, as a Muslim Malay.

=== Later life ===
In 1927, the Director of a telephone company, Mr Tate, recruited Lily Eberwein to work as a telephone operator, making her the first Malay woman to work in a Government Department. She had an excellent command of both Malay and English, as was required of a telephone operator, and her father had been a family friend of Mr. Tate's.

In 1929, she resigned from this post when the Brooke Government appointed her as the Principal of the Permaisuri Malay Girls’ School, which was opened in Kuching in 1930. She was also the secretary of the Malay section, while Mary Ong, Barbara Bay and Mrs. Gopal headed Chinese, Iban and Indian section. Through her educational activities, both religious and secular, she became known as Cikgu (teacher) Lily. Noticeably, she was over the age for marriage at that time.

=== Marriage ===
She married in 1938 and proceeded to have three daughters, with the first, Hafsah, being born in 1940. Her husband, Harun bin Haris, was ten years her junior, with only five years of primary education, and worked in the Sarawak Police Constabulary. Her husband was very supportive of her involvement in the Anti-Cession movement and her passion for education. In Sarawak at that time, being married at a later age and having a much younger husband would definitely have been controversial. However, Lily seemed to be able to take it all in her stride. She was highly respected, especially among Malay people because of her dedication to educating Malay girls.

== Involvement in politics ==
During the Japanese occupation in Sarawak, the Japanese appointed Lily as the leader of the Malay section of the Kaum Ibu, a multiethnic women's association. In March 1947, she was elected as the chairperson of the women's wing of the Malay National Union of Sarawak (PKMS), a leading group in the Anti-Cession Movement. Lily resigned from her post as the principal of Permaisuri Girls School in 1947 as a sign of protest against the Cession but she continued her role as an educationalist by establishing new schools.

As the anti-cession struggle continued, many Malay government schools were closed. This became a serious concern as affected students could not find places in other Malay schools. Four schools in Kuching and another in Sibu were established by those teachers who resigned. To assist children of resigned public servants who boycotted government schools, Lily helped to establish a religious school for girls and women (sekolah rakyat) in the premise of the Masjid Bintangor Haji Taha Building. Lily and teachers who resigned in protest against the circular taught in these schools without pay.

In an interview by The Straits Times Singapore dated 21 July 1947 on the Anti-Cession movement, Lily Eberwein expressed her concern for its impact on Malay education. In the article entitled “Education Standstill”, Lily stated that the protest against cession had had the most serious effect on education, which was virtually at a standstill. She emphasised that the position of education in Sarawak must remain a matter of gravest public concern “for as long as this unhappy controversy lasts”, referring to cession. She also stated, “We Malays, in conjunction with the other indigenous races, will fight with unwavering purpose for the redress of the wrong that has been done to our people in the extinction of our nationhood and independence”. In the article she clearly identified herself as a member of the Malay community and with the cause of Sarawak's national independence, but also expresses her concern about the effects of the nationalist struggle on education and thus on the people of Sarawak. In Anthony Brooke's memoir, he clearly recognised the importance of the women's role in the Anti-Cession movement. He specifically highlighted Lily Eberwein's effort, stating that: “a new impetus was given to the movement due to the initiative head teacher Lily Eberwein, who formed a women’s branch of the movement. This met with considerable support from women of all ages from throughout the count.”

== Women right's movement ==
Although Lily Eberwein was a very active anti-cessionist, she never joined any political parties. Nevertheless, she was the first woman to be appointed as a Councillor of Kuching Municipal Council in 1950. She was a pioneer for women in public life in Sarawak. She participated actively in various voluntary organisations such as the Prisoners’ Aid Society, Anti-Tuberculosis Association Sarawak (ATAS), and the Red Cross. She remained the Chairman of Kaum Ibu in the Malay National Union of Sarawak until 1960 when she also retired from her own school, Satok English School. Occasionally after that she assisted her daughter Hafsah Harun who replaced her as the school Principal.
