= Kolej DPAH Abdillah =

Public high school in Kuching, Sarawak, Malaysia

Location
- Lorong Siol Kandis 1 Kuching, Sarawak, 93050; Malaysia
- 1°34′41″N 110°21′12″E

Information
- Type: Public semi-boarding school
- Motto: Arif dan Maju (Wisdom and Progress)
- Established: September 29, 1979; 46 years ago
- Headmaster: Adzuddin bin Mantrang
- Age: 13 to 17
- Language: English; Malay; Japanese (some)
- Houses: All Blacks; Lions; Springboks; Wallabies
- Student Union/Association: Majlis Perwakilan Permata
- Slogan: We Must, We Can, We Will Excel, Eureka Yes!
- Song: Hearts & Minds; Arif dan Maju
- Rugby team: Wolfpack

Kolej Datu Patinggi Abang Haji Abdillah (KDPAHA; English: Datu Patinggi Abang Haji Abdillah College), often called the Kolej Abdillah (Abdillah College), is a public semi-boarding secondary school located in Kuching, Sarawak, Malaysia.

== History ==
Datu Patinggi Abang Haji Abdillah College was officially opened on 29 September 1978. Dubbed the 'Eton of Borneo', the college was formerly known as Datu Patinggi Abang Haji Abdillah Junior Science College. Its original purpose was to serve as a Junior college for Form 6 students who obtained good results in their Form 5 examination. In later years, the college started admitting Form 1 to Form 5 students while still keeping the Kolej (College) prefix. Admission for Form 6 students was halted in 2005.

The plan to build the school was granted by the Federal Government in 1972 under the Second Malaysia Plan (RMK-2). The construction was completed in 1978, covering 8 hectares.

The college was named after Datu Patinggi Abang Haji Abdillah, a local politician who served under Charles Vyner Brooke. He was a well known patriot who opposed the cession of Sarawak to the Monarchy of the United Kingdom in 1946.

=== Principals ===
Adzuddin bin Haji Mantrang was appointed as the 13th Principal of Datu Patinggi Abang Haji Abdillah College in October 2022, succeeding Abang Othman who has served the post since October 2019. Prior to that, Adzuddin was the principal of Sekolah Menengah Kebangsaan Lundu. He is also the Deputy President of Kesatuan Guru Bumiputera Sarawak (KGBS).

1. Putit Matzen (1978–1982)
2. Sukinam Domo (1983–1984)
3. Morshidi Ali (1985–1989)
4. Mohd Zain Abang Ismail (1989–1992)
5. Michael Manyin Jawong (1993–1995)
6. Putit bin Ped (1995–2004)
7. Halimah binti Haji Mohd Sahari (2004–2007)
8. Johara Zen (2007–2011)
9. Mastura binti Anuar (2011–2015)
10. Ibrahim bin Jamain (2015–2017)
11. Catherine Ritikos @ Fiziah Abdullah (2017–2019)
12. Abang Othman bin Abang Masagus (2019–2022)
13. Adzuddin bin Mantrang (2022–present)

=== Tradition ===
- Students addressed their principal as 'Ayahanda' (Malay for father) or 'Bonda' (Malay for mother). A slight variation was made for Madam Johara Zen, who is referred to as 'Ummi', which translates to mother in Arabic.
- Prior to 2004, the school anthem was played by a student on a piano in every assembly. However, the tradition stopped in 2004. An attempt to revive the tradition by Datin Hajah Halimah was met with failure.
- Madam Johara Zen changed the names for the classes to the names of precious minerals; Indigo (Indigo) to Amethyst, Merah (Red) to Ruby, Biru (Blue) to Sapphire, Kuning (Yellow) to Topaz, Hijau (Green) to Emerald, Putih (White) to Diamond and Jingga (Orange) to Amber (the class does not exist anymore now) in 2007.
- The Pelajar Bestari song was replaced with the government-created song; Hearts and Minds by Madam Johara Zen.
- Prior to the principal Haji Ibrahim period, a battle cry, "We Must, We Can, We Will Excel, Eureka Yes!", was adopted and will be chanted every time the principal finishes his speech.

The college's motto is Arif dan Maju (Wisdom and Progress), which is also the title of one of its two anthems. The second anthem, Arif dan Maju (written by Wan Danial Samiun Bin Wan Mohamad), was introduced during Putit bin Haji Ped's tenure as the Principal when the college was declared a Smart School. However, Pelajar Bestari was replaced by Hearts and Minds during Mdm. Johara Zen's administration in 2007. In 2005, during Datin Halimah's administration, We Must, We Can, We Will Excel was adopted as the college slogan. Ibrahim bin Haji Jamain added a popular phrase to the college slogan: "We Must, We Can, We Will Excel, Eureka Yes!" This phrase has since become a rallying cry for the entire college community.

== Academic ==
=== Admission ===
Admission to the school is monitored and conducted by the State Education Board. Since 2017, after the implementation of both KSSM and KSSR programmes under the Ministry of Education, there are no specific minimum requirements to enter the school, instead a student (Form 1) whom applied the admission to this school, with good results in UPSR will be called for an interview.

== Student activities ==
The school has been competitive in the Young Entrepreneurs Program, and it won several national awards in 2002 and 2005, defeating other schools in Malaysia, two of which are Malay College Kuala Kangsar and Victoria Institution.

=== Debate and public speaking ===
Abdillah College produced great orators in 1980, winning the Chief Minister's Cup Malay Debate Championship. The person in-charge of the Malay language debate team, (Cikgu Bhaludin Salleh) has resigned and opened a well known tuition centre named Pusat Bimbingan Karya.

It was the year 2006 when Abdillah College won the Sarawak Bahasa Melayu Parliamentary Style Debate. Under the guidance of Cikgu Zaidi and Cikgu Maimunah, the team placed second in the National (Borneo) Bahasa Melayu Parliamentary Style Debate which was held in Labuan.

In 2005, Abdillah College won the State-level Royal Cup Speech Competition and its representative, Junnyaruin Barat was selected to represent Sarawak in national-level competition.

In 2008, the English Debate team under the guidance of Madam Maria Tan trained with the Debate Team of Universiti Teknologi MARA (UiTM) Sarawak. UiTM Sarawak was the Borneo Cup Debating Tournament champion for 2006 and 2008, as well as one of the finalists in the Vice-Chancellor Cup Debating Championship in 2007 which was held in Shah Alam. The Abdillah College-UiTM collaboration was funded by the Parents-Teachers Association. The representatives for the year's English Debate was Nalisha Laila [first speaker], Nor Shafiqah [second speaker], Aliff Farhan [third speaker] and Ajibah [reserve].

In 2013, the English Debate team won the Inter-School English Parliamentary Style Debate Competition, Divisional Level. The competition was hosted by SMK Bau. The team then placed 2nd-runner-up in the State level competition held in Limbang. In the same year, the debate team consisting of Joshua Chew [first speaker], Nor Atikah [second speaker] and Azeem Abadi [third speaker] emerged as champions in the Kenyalang Debate Muda Tournament organised by UiTM, Kota Samarahan. Azeem Abadi was awarded the Best Debater in the finals while Joshua Chew was awarded Third Best Speaker of the tournament. Abdillah College's English Debate team was also the Champion for the National ICT Security Debate : CyberSAFE Challenge Trophy Sarawak Zone. The team represented Sarawak at the National level, making it to 3rd place.

In 2014, the debate team consisting of Joshua Chew [first speaker], Muhammad Rahiman [second speaker] and Azeem Abadi [third speaker] were finalists of the Asian Parliamentary Inter School Debate Competition in Curtin University, Miri. Joshua Chew was awarded the Best Speaker of the final round. Two other students, Nor Atikah and Siti Nurfatihah, participated in the Oratory Competition, which was held concurrently with the debate competition in Curtin University, Miri. Nor Atikah emerged as the champion and Siti Nurfatihah was the 2nd runner up. Earlier in the year, Abdillah College had several teams participating in the Swinburne Sarawak Inter School Debate Championship held in Swinburne University of Technology Sarawak Campus. In the Senior category, Team A composed of Joshua Chew, Nor Atikah and Azeem Abadi, qualified for the breaking rounds, breaking 8th, and were quarter finalists of the tournament. Debaters of Abdillah College also participated in open tournaments, such as the Borneo British Parliamentary Debate Competition, held in Universiti Malaysia Sarawak, Kota Samarahan. Team A were quarter finalists of the tournament.

In 2015, an official Oratory Club was founded.

In 2020, the debate team consisting of Muhammad Abdul Aziz [first speaker], Ameera Nailya [second speaker] and Eddry Haqimy [third speaker] achieved a notable milestone when they became the first collegian debate team to break into the semi-finals of the prestigious Swinburne Sarawak Inter-School Debating Championship (SSIDC), senior category. Two years prior, Muhammad Abdul Aziz and Eddry Haqimy, along with Dayang Azizah as the third speaker paved the way for collegian debate teams by becoming the forerunner among collegian debaters to break further than quarter-finals as juniors. Currently, this is the most notable and accomplished achievements a debate team from the school has ever held, due to the sheer size and competition of SSIDC.

=== Young Entrepreneurs Programme ===
The Young Entrepreneurs Programme (YEP) of Abdillah College is probably the most acclaimed club in the school. It has represented the state of Sarawak several times.

==== List of YEP companies ====
- 2002: College Hillz Sdn. Bhd.
- 2003: Abdillahz Empire Sdn. Bhd.
- 2004: Enigma 42 Sdn. Bhd
- 2006: F.L.A.M.E. Sdn. Bhd.
- 2014: Avenue Sdn. Bhd.
- 2015: A.C.E. Sdn. Bhd.

==== List of YEP achievements ====
- 2003 - Abdillahz Empire Sdn. Bhd

State Level Third place in Report Presentation

- 2004 - Enigma 42 Sdn. Bhd

State Level

- Best Company Award
- Best Report Presentation
- Best General Manager Award - Syed Nizamuddin Bin Sayed Khassim
- Best Administrative Manager Award - Noor Afreeda binti Nawawi
- Best Operational Manage Award - Nor Azwani Adenan
- Best Marketing Manager Award - Normalyana Samsudin
- Best Finance Manager Award - Abdul Hafeedzil Iqbal bin Wajidi

==== National Level ====
- Runner-up in Report Presentation Category

=== School publications ===
The SPEKTRA is the school's official yearbook or annual magazine and is also the longest running school publication. The editorial board consists of students and teachers. However, the main body of the editorial board consists of students. In 2015, SPEKTRA publication was taken over by Abdillah College Multimedia Club after responsible publisher, which was Mr. Mohd Noor bin Lamat moved out to his new school.

Buletin Bestari is the school's official newsletter, published by the Briged Bestari of Abdillah College. It is unclear as to when Briged Bestari started its publication, but it has been said that it was first published since the school opened. For unknown reasons the school stopped publishing Buletin Bestari in the 1990s. The Media and Computer Club published their own newsletter, Owl's in 2004, in an attempt to start a new official newsletter.

In 2005, the extra curricular adviser changed the name and structure of the Media and Computer Club to Briged Bestari, which in result replaced Owl's with the reborn Buletin Bestari. The Buletin Bestari was republished in the same year.

Other publications include newsletters published by the school's own Young Entrepreneurs Program (YEP) companies, such as the From the Eyes of Collegians newsletter.

G News is the production of news by the school and started since 2011. It is shown during the assembly to all the students in the school. G News reports on current issues surrounding the school and the achievements of students in extracurricular or curricular activities. It's now currently had stopped publishing since there is no video editor in the school.

== Notable alumni ==
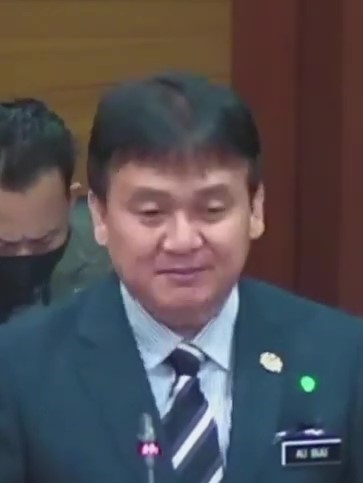
Ali Biju, Malaysian politician and civil engineer

=== Politics ===
- Michael Manyin; the fifth Principal of the school, joined politics after leaving, an assemblyman for Tebedu constituency.
- Ali Biju, former Deputy Minister of Energy and Natural Resources and Member of Parliament for P.205 Saratok.
- Ahmad Johnie Zawawi, Chairman of Indah Water and Member of Parliament for P.207 Igan.
- Sharifah Hasidah Sayeed Aman Ghazali, State Deputy Minister in Premier Department (Law, MA63 and State-Federal Relations) and Member of Sarawak State Legislative Assembly for N.7 Samariang.
- Billy Sujang, Member of Sarawak State Legislative Assembly for N.01 Opar.

=== Civil services ===
- Wan Ahmad Dahlan Abdul Aziz, 27th Director-General of Public Service Department.
- Syed Nizamuddin Bin Sayed Khassim, Malaysian diplomat, author, and columnist.

== In popular media ==
Abdillah College's extra-large Jalur Gemilang was featured in Malaysia's media in year 2002 and 2003.
