= Rukun 13 =

Defunct pro-independence organisation (1947-50) in British Sarawak

- Formation: 1947; 79 years ago
- Dissolved: March 1950; 76 years ago
- Region served: Crown Colony of Sarawak

Rukun 13 or Rukun Tiga Belas (The Thirteen Pillars) is a defunct Sarawakian organisation that existed from 1947 until 1950. Rukun 13 was a secret cell organisation, composed of nationalists, which carried out assassinations of officers of the British colonial government in Sarawak.

== Formation ==
This organisation was officially formed at the end of 1947 in opposition to the Cession to the United Kingdom in Sarawak. At first, the organisation had planned to kill the British Governor Sir Charles Noble Arden-Clarke but the plan never came to fruition. After Sir Arden-Clarke was transferred to the Gold Coast colony he was succeeded by Duncan George Stewart.

The objective of the group is to establish a union with the newly independent Indonesia. However, the British decided to keep this information a secret so as not to blame the assassination on Indonesian nationalists and provoke a full-scale war with Indonesia.

== Penalty and disestablishment ==
After Duncan Stewart was fatally wounded by Rosli Dhobi and later died in Singapore General Hospital, the British arrested all Rukun 13 members by March 1950. The 2 main members of Rukun 13, Rosli Dhobi and Awang Rambli were sentenced to death together with 2 other people, Bujang Suntong and Morshidi Sidek who were not Rukun 13 members. The rest of the Rukun 13 members were jailed.

The four executed members were buried within a prison in Kuching. On 2 March 1996, their remains were exhumed and moved to Masjid An-Nur in Sibu.

== List of Rukun 13 members ==
- Rosli Dhobi
- Awang Rambli Amit Mohd Deli
- Abg Ahmad
- Osman Dollah
- Morni Junit
- Jack Yusof
- Awang Osman
- Abg Han Abg Ahmad
- Wan Zin
- Che Alias Osman
- Tambek Adun
- Amin Jenal
- Abg Mat Sirat
