= Gita Brooke =

Danish peace activist and community worker

Birgitte "Gita" Brooke (née Keller, 1931–2020) was a Danish and New Zealand peace activist and community worker. She co-founded the organisation Operation Peace Through Unity organisation in Sweden in 1975 and lived in both India and Whanganui, New Zealand.

== Biography ==
Keller was born in 1931 in Denmark but was raised in India, where she was given her nickname 'Gita' by which she would be known for the remainder of her life.

Brooke and her husband set up the Peace Through Unity organisation in Sweden in 1975, also known as Peace Through Unity. Peace Through Unity was a United Nations accredited non-governmental organisation and part of their work was a quarterly newsletter titled Many to Many, with "news items, strategies, poems and letters from around the world, for use in the cause of peace, environmental protection and the rights of indigenous peoples".

In 1983, Brooke and her husband embarked on a year-long global mission of peace, coinciding with Sarawak's 20th anniversary of independence.

Brooke arrived in Whanganui with her husband, Anthony Brooke in 1987 after ten years of travelling. There they were advocates for non-violence, Indigenous rights and resolution of armed conflict and well known in Whanganui. Te Whare o Rehua Sarjeant Gallery has a drawing in their collection by Joanna Margaret Paul of Gita and Anthony Brooke. Peace Through Unity enabled the Handspan sculpture at Pukenamu Queen’s Park, Whanganui by potter Ross Mitchell-Anyon (1954–2022).

In her will Brooke and her husband vested Te Rangi, their home in Whanganui into the Peace Through Unity Charitable Trust, ensuring the house, its contents, and the garden would be used to serve as a place of peace. It is used for philanthropic purposes including in 2013 a scholarship residency.

== Personal life and death ==
Brooke had a daughter and a number of grandchildren and great-grandchildren.

Brooke died at home in Whanganui on 23 February 2020 aged 88 and was married to Anthony Brooke who was the 3rd White Rajah Muda of Sarawak.
