= Anti-cession movement of Sarawak =

Anti-colonial activism, 1946-1950

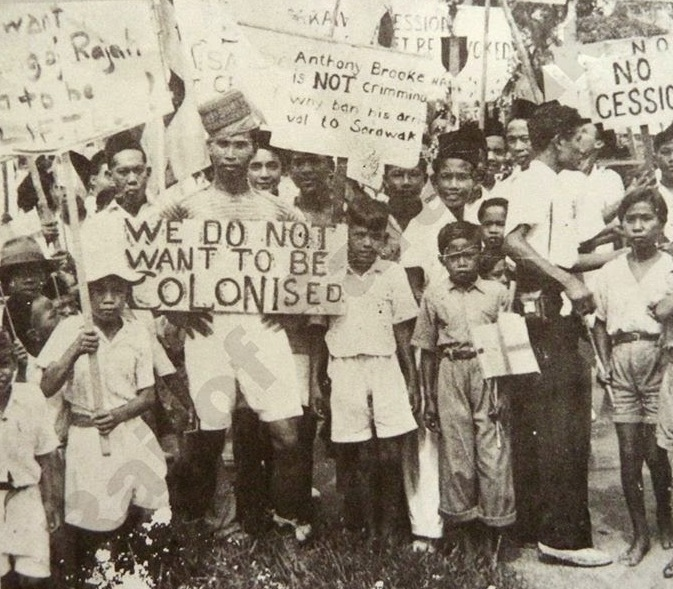
- Sarawakian demonstration against the British. This photo would later become the trademark of the Sarawak Anti-cession Movement.
Location
Result
Sarawak (now part of Malaysia)
- Assassination of the second Governor of Sarawak, Sir Duncan Stewart, in 1949.
- Closure of more than 22 schools in Sarawak.
- 56 students quit their university studies.
- All associations of anti-cession dissolved by British Authorities.
- Colonial rule continued until 16 September 1963.

Belligerents
Anti-cession movement: Rukun 13	United Kingdom; Young Malay Association

Commanders and leaders
Anthony Brooke; Abang Haji Abdillah; Lily Eberwein; Rosli Dhobi ☠	Charles Arden-Clarke; Duncan George Stewart †; Anthony Abell

The anti-cession movement of Sarawak (Malay: Gerakan Anti-Penyerahan Sarawak) was a movement in Sarawak to fight against the British attempt to govern Sarawak as a crown colony rather than a protectorate ruled by the White Rajahs. The movement lasted from 1 July 1946 until March 1950.

== Factors ==
The anti-cession movement of Sarawak arose from the violation of a provision in the 1941 constitution of Sarawak, which stipulated that Rajah Charles Vyner Brooke would grant the right of self-rule to Sarawak. Instead, he decided to cede it to Britain as a Crown colony on 8 February 1946. Secondly, the Sarawakian people had believed that the rule of the Brooke family could be expected to lead to independence for Sarawak, but heir apparent Anthony Brooke was not appointed as the next Rajah. In addition, the decision was taken without the consent of the indigenous people. The British did discuss it with the local people, but declared Sarawak a crown colony on 1 July 1946 anyway, with support from British officers and European residents.

The idea of anti-colonialism started when the newspaper Fajar Sarawak was first published. The idea was later carried on by the newspaper Utusan Sarawak.

== Overview of movement ==
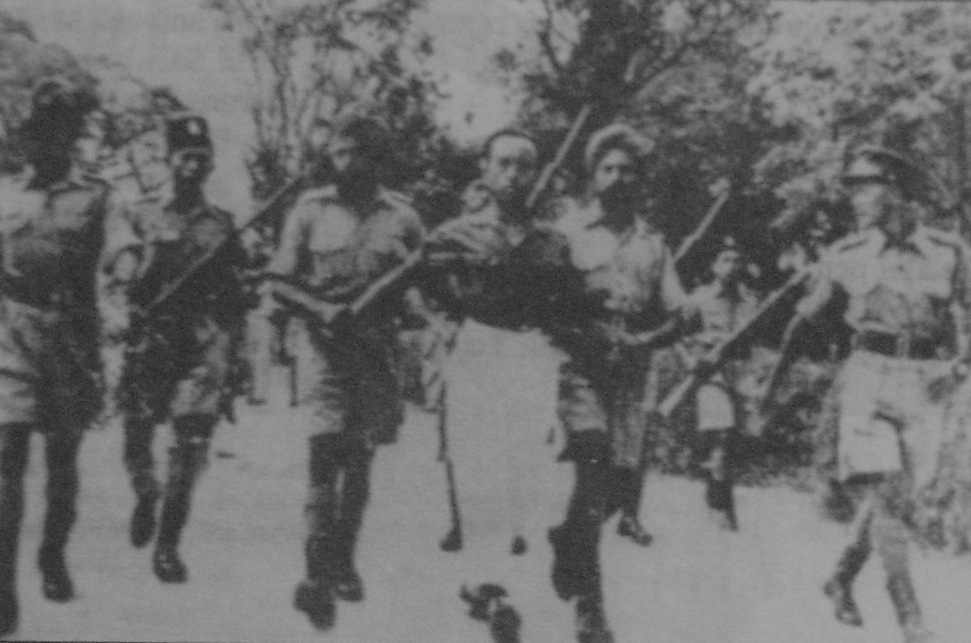
Rosli Dhobi caught by policemen for murdering Duncan Stewart

Many Malays joined Datu Patinggi Abang Haji Abdillah and Datu Patinggi Haji Mohammad Kassim to fight against cession of Sarawak to Britain. Many other local associations, such as the Malay National Union of Sarawak (PKMS), took part as well. Members of the movement sent a letter objecting to cession to the Colonial Office in London. They also displayed an anti-cession poster in all the villages of Sarawak, and local people, including women, held demonstrations against it. However, when the authorities discovered that most of the members of the movement were civil servants, "Circular No.9" was issued and signed by C. W. Dawson on 31 December 1946, to warn civil servants that it was illegal to participate in political movements, on pain of dismissal from their post. More than 338 public employees, mostly teachers, resigned on 2 April 1947 in protest against the circular. These resignations forced the closure of more than 22 schools in Sarawak. 56 students also quit their university studies to denounce the circular. The largest demonstration took place on 1 July 1947, when the British government appointed Sir Charles Arden-Clarke, former Resident Commissioner of Bechuanaland (present-day Botswana) as the first Governor of the British Crown Colony of Sarawak. From that date onwards, demonstrations increased.

The British government, intending to put an end to the anti-cession movement, tried to disrupt the close relationship between Malays and the indigenous Dayak people. They also tried to weaken the movement by saying that the colonisation of Sarawak aimed to bring better life to Malays and encouraging the formation of the Young Malay Association (YMA), which supported the colonisation of Sarawak. YMA members were picked at random from the anti-cession camp – if they refused to join, their children would be unable to attend school or work in the Civil Service. The British government also pursued psychological warfare against the anti-cession movement, causing it to decline from December 1947 on.

After an unsuccessful attempt, thirteen radical members of the Sibu Malay Youth Movement formed a secret organisation called Rukun 13 (The 13 Pillars). This organisation aimed to eradicate all European and Malay officers who were in favour of British rule in Sarawak. Rukun 13 members Rosli Dhobi and Awang Ramli Amit Mohd Deli, together with non-members Morshidi Sidek and Bujang Suntong, assassinated Sir Duncan Stewart, the second Governor of Sarawak, when he arrived in Sibu on 3 December 1949. He died in Singapore General Hospital a week later. This incident led the British authorities to try to crush the anti-cession movement once and for all, by any means possible. All Rukun 13 members were arrested in March 1950. The four assassins were sentenced to death while the remaining members sentenced to jail. After the end of the anti-cession movement, Sarawak remained under British Government rule until self-government was established on 22 July 1963, after which it co-founded the Federation of Malaysia on 16 September 1963.
