= Abang Haji Abdillah =

Sarawak politician (1862–1946)

Portrait of Abdillah

Datu Patinggi Abang Haji Abdillah (13 October 1862 – 21 November 1946) was a Sarawakian politician in Sarawak who participated in the movement opposing cessation to the British Empire. He was the son of Datu Bandar Abang Haji Mohammad Kassim; who served as mayor of Kuching under the White Rajah's administration. He was also the grandson of Datu Bandar Abang Haji Bolhassan and a descendant of Datu Patinggi Ali who fought to achieve Sarawak's independence from Brunei. After the death of his father in Mecca, in 1922, he was given the title Datu Muda. In 1924, he became the Datu Bandar and then in 1939, he was given the title Datu Patinggi.

== Anti-cession movement ==
Abdillah stated his support for the anti-cession movement of Sarawak as such:

"My people and I would never agree with the cession of Sarawak to the British Crown!...We cherish the independence of this state where we were born..."

"Saya dan rakyat tidak bersetuju dengan penyerahan Sarawak kepada Tanah Jajahan Mahkota British!...Saya dan rakyat mencintai kemerdekaan negeri ini, tanah tumpah darah saya..."

In a meeting with British officials, he protested the cession of Sarawak to the British Empire; claiming that the cession was illegal as it was not accepted by majority of the Sarawakian. Abdillah was a major proponent of reinstating Anthony Walter Dayrell Brooke as the fourth White Rajah of Sarawak. However, the cession occurred and he resigned from the State Supreme Council in response. He then started to oppose the British government in his speeches; however, Abdillah opposed the use of violence to prevent cessation. All government officials in Sarawak, European and Asian alike, were sent Circular no.9, which stated that they would be fired if any of them continued to support the anti-cession movement. Perhaps following the footsteps of Datu Patinggi, many of the Sarawakian officials resigned from their posts. Abdillah continued to oppose the cession of Sarawak to Britain until his death in 1946.

== Death and legacy ==
As a community leader, Abdillah worked to establish good relations between the Dayaks and Malays. Unfortunately, after his death the anti-cession movement lost its momentum and quickly became disorganised without a leader. The violent techniques used by some anti-cessionists activists, such as assassinating colonial officials, decreased support for the movement. Britain ruled Sarawak until the formation of Malaysia on 16 September 1963. A school was built in his name to honour, Kolej Datu Patinggi Abang Haji Abdillah.

== See also ==
- Kolej Datu Patinggi Abang Haji Abdillah

== Bibliography ==
- Malaysia History Textbook for Form 3 (Buku Teks Sejarah TIngkatan 3) Published by: Dewan Bahasa dan Pustaka.
- Sulaiman, Haji Mohd. Hasbie (1989). Perjuangan Anti-Cession Sarawak. PGI Cipta Sdn Bhd. ISBN 983-99640-0-3.
