= 1941 constitution of Sarawak =

The 1941 constitution of Sarawak is the first known written constitution in the Raj of Sarawak in Borneo. Written in the English language, the constitution was proclaimed by the third White Rajah of Sarawak, Charles Vyner Brooke on 24 September 1941, which ends the century of sole sovereignty of Brooke's rule and for the people of Sarawak to their own constitutional government.

However, his constitution was not implemented due to the Japanese occupation. After the war, Sarawak was financially devastated. Without the discussion and approval of the local Malay and Dayaks leaders Charles Vyner Brooke decided to cede Sarawak to the British. This caused huge dissatisfaction among the locals, who would later form a protest about the cession of Sarawak to the United Kingdom.

== Nine Cardinal principles ==
Charles Vyner Brooke said the drafting of the constitution was "to ensure that our beloved subjects shall ultimately enjoy their inherent right to control their own lives and destinies". The formulation of the constitution is guided by nine cardinal principles. The Rajah's powers almost completely transferred to the Supreme Council (equivalent to Sarawak cabinet today) and Council Negri (equivalent to Sarawak state legislative assembly today). The Supreme Council consists of a minimum of five members with the majority of the members drawn from Sarawak Civil Service (SCS). The Rajah should only act with the advice and consent of the Supreme Council. Meanwhile, the Council Negri is consisting of 25 members (14 official members and 11 unofficial members), where the majority was drawn from senior SCS members. The Council Negri has the power to pass any bills on three occasions, even if the Rajah refused to assent the bill on the first two occasions.

The cardinal principle no 7 also mentioned that "Subjects of whatever race or creed shall be freely and impartially admitted to offices in Our Service". Religious beliefs were not mentioned in this constitution, as Sarawak was a secular state under Brooke's rule. The constitution also continued the Sarawak's status as an independent state with the British responsible for defense and foreign affairs.

The nine cardinal principles are as follows:

1. That Sarawak is the heritage of Our Subjects and is held in trust by Ourselves for them.
2. That social and education services shall be developed and improved and the standard of living of the people of Sarawak shall steadily be raised.
3. That never shall any person or persons be granted rights inconsistent with those of the people of this country or be in any way permitted to exploit Our Subjects or those who have sought Our protection and care.
4. That justice shall be freely obtainable and that the Rajah and every public servant shall be easily accessible to the public.
5. That freedom of expression both in speech and in writing shall be permitted and encouraged and that everyone shall be entitled to worship as he pleases.
6. That public servants shall ever remember that they are but the servants of the people on whose goodwill and co-operation they are entirely dependent.
7. That so far as may be Our Subjects of whatever race or creed shall be freely and impartially admitted to offices in Our Service, the duties of which they may be qualified by their education, ability and integrity duly to discharge.
8. That the goal of self-government shall always be kept in mind, that the people of Sarawak shall be entrusted in due course with the governance of themselves, and that continuous efforts shall be made to hasten the reaching of this goal by educating them in the obligations, the responsibilities, and the privileges of citizenship.
9. That the general policy of Our predecessors and Ourselves whereby the various races of the State have been enabled to live in happiness and harmony together shall be adhered to by Our successors and Our servants and all who may follow them hereafter.

== Aftermath ==
With the Japanese occupation in Sarawak from 25 December 1941 to 1945, the constitution was not implemented. Sarawak was ceded to the British as a Crown colony on 1 July 1946 after the war. To avoid offending local feelings, the nine cardinal principles in the 1941 constitution were implemented and later amended to reflect the transfer of power to the British governor in the new constitution. Further amendments were made in 1956, 1962, and 1963 to reflect a representative government.

In 1961, Sarawak United People's Party (SUPP) opposed the formation of Malaysia, while demanding that Sarawak should be granted independence according to the Nine Cardinal Principles. In 1962, Sarawak political leaders proposed the 18-point agreement which was based on the Nine Cardinal Principles as part of the demands before the formation of Malaysia.

After Malaysia was formed on 16 September 1963, the Nine Cardinal Principles was not included in the Constitution of Malaysia.
