= Charles Arden-Clarke =

British colonial administrator (1898–1962)

Sir Charles Noble Arden-Clarke GCMG GCStJ
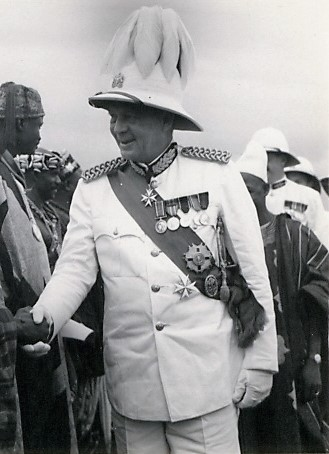

Governor-General of Ghana
- In office 6 March 1957 – 24 June 1957
- Monarch: Elizabeth II
- Prime Minister: Kwame Nkrumah
- Preceded by: Position established
- Succeeded by: The Earl of Listowel

Governor of the Gold Coast
- In office 11 August 1949 – 6 March 1957
- Monarchs: George VI; Elizabeth II
- Prime Minister: Kwame Nkrumah (21 March 1952 – 6 March 1957)
- Preceded by: Sir Robert Scott
- Succeeded by: Position abolished

British High Commissioner to Brunei
- In office 1948–1949
- Preceded by: Malcolm MacDonald
- Succeeded by: C.W. Dawson

Resident Commissioner of Bechuanaland
- In office 1937–1942
- Preceded by: Charles Fernand Rey
- Succeeded by: Aubrey Denzil Forsyth-Thompson

1st Governor of Sarawak
- In office 1 July 1946 – 26 July 1949
- Monarch: George VI
- Preceded by: Charles Vyner Brooke (Rajah of Sarawak)
- Succeeded by: Duncan George Stewart

Personal details
- Born: 25 July 1898 Bournemouth, England
- Died: 16 December 1962 (aged 64) Syleham, England

Sir Charles Noble Arden-Clarke GCMG GCStJ (25 July 1898 – 16 December 1962) was a British colonial administrator.

== Biography ==
Arden-Clarke was educated at Rossall School. He was the Resident Commissioner of the Bechuanaland Protectorate (later Botswana) between 1937 and 1942, a time at which the ruling regent Tshekedi Khama was in violent conflict with the British authorities. He was the Resident Commissioner of Basutoland from August 1942 to November 1946, and in 1946 was appointed as the first Governor of the newly created British Crown Colony of Sarawak, which was ceded in 1946 by the Kingdom of Sarawak. During his governorship in Sarawak he was despised by locals as, upon his appointment, Sarawak was engulfed with the Anti-cession Movement, which led to the assassination of his successor, Duncan Stewart in 1949 by the radical members of the Anti-cession movement.

On 1 May 1948, he assumed the position of High Commissioner to Brunei. Documents were neither signed nor exchanged between Arden-Clarke and Anthony Abell, only the reading of the appointment for him was made in front of Brunei dignitaries in the State Court House. He promised the people of Brunei that it was his duty and responsibility to protect the interests and welfare of Brunei and its inhabitants and to contribute to its future development and progress. He was replaced by C.W. Dawson in October 1949.

After Sarawak, he was the last governor of the Gold Coast (later Ghana), from August 1949 until 1957, taking up residence in Fort Christiansborg. On 12 February 1951, he authorised Kwame Nkrumah's release from imprisonment in James Fort. After independence, he was named the first Governor-General of Ghana in 1957. Arden-Clarke's acceptance of the Africans and his attitude towards Kwame Nkrumah likely contributed to Ghana's relatively smooth transition to independence.

== Archives ==
Papers of Charles Arden-Clarke giving an insight into events during the transition of the Gold Coast to independent Ghana (1949-1957) are held by SOAS Special Collections

Government offices
Preceded by Charles Fernand Rey	Resident Commissioner of Bechuanaland; 1937–1942^{1}	Succeeded by Aubrey Denzil Forsyth-Thompson
New creation	Governor of Sarawak; 1946–1949^{2}	Succeeded by Duncan George Stewart
Preceded by Sir Robert Scott	Governor of the Gold Coast; 1949–1957^{3}	Post abolished
New creation	Governor-General of Ghana; 1957^{3}	Succeeded by The Earl of Listowel
Notes and references
1. http://www.rulers.org/rulb1.html#botswana 2. http://www.rulers.org/rulg1.html#ghana
