= Charles Vyner Brooke =

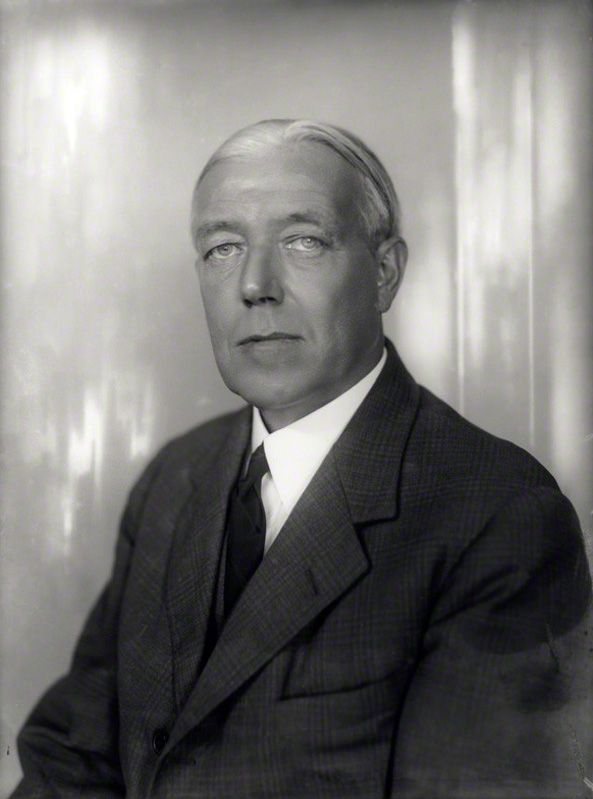
- Official portrait, 1932

3rd Rajah of Sarawak
- Reign: 24 May 1917 – 1 July 1946
- Predecessor: Charles Brooke
- Successor: Monarchy abolished Charles Arden-Clarke (as Governor of Sarawak)
- Born: 26 September 1874; London, United Kingdom
- Died: 9 May 1963 (aged 88); Westminster, United Kingdom
- Burial: St Leonard's Church, Sheepstor
- Spouse: Sylvia Brett (m. 1911)
- Issue: Leonora Margaret Brooke; Elizabeth Brooke; Nancy Valerie Brooke
Names
- Charles Vyner de Windt Brooke
- House: Brooke
- Father: Sir Charles Brooke
- Mother: Margaret Brooke
- Religion: Anglicanism
- Education: Winchester College; University of Cambridge
- Military career
- Allegiance: United Kingdom
- Branch: British Army; Royal Navy
- Service years: 1911–1917
- Rank: Second Lieutenant
- Units: 3rd London Yeomanry; 21 SAS Regiment

Sir Charles Vyner de Windt Brooke (26 September 1874 – 9 May 1963) was the last rajah of Sarawak from 1917 until his abdication in 1946. His cession of Sarawak to the British Empire marked the end of the Raj of Sarawak as well as the Brooke dynasty's 100-year rule over Sarawak.

== Early life and education ==
Charles Vyner Brooke was the son of Charles Brooke and Margaret de Windt. He was born in London and spent his youth there, being educated at Clevedon, Winchester College, and Magdalene College, Cambridge.

== Early career ==
=== Sarawak Civil Service ===
Vyner served as aide-de-camp to his father (1897–1898), a district officer of Simanggang (1898–1901), Resident of Mukah and Oya, (1902–1903), Resident of the Third Division (1903–1904), President of the Law Courts (1904–1911) and vice-president of the Supreme and General Councils (1904–1911).

=== Military service ===
Vyner was commissioned as a second lieutenant into the 3rd County of London Yeomanry (Sharpshooters) on 12 May 1911, but resigned from the (County of London) Battalion (Artist's Rifles) on 21 May 1913. During the First World War he served incognito as a rating in a naval anti-aircraft defence unit, and as a fitter in an aeroplane manufacturing works at Shoreditch, East London.

On 21 February 1911 whilst in the United Kingdom he married Sylvia Brett, daughter of Reginald Brett, Viscount Esher. He was granted the personal style of His Highness by command of King George V, 22 June 1911.

== Rajah of Sarawak ==
=== Reign ===
Vyner succeeded his father as White Rajah on 17 May 1917 following his death and was proclaimed Rajah on 24 May 1917 at Kuching. He took the oath before the Council Negri on 22 July 1918. Vyner's early years as Rajah (a role he performed in tandem with his younger brother, Bertram, in accord with their father's wish) saw a boom in Sarawak's rubber and oil industries and the subsequent rise in the Sarawak economy allowed him to modernise the country's institutions, including the public service, and introduce a penal code based on that of British India in 1924.

He was appointed a Knight Grand Cross of the Order of St Michael and St George (GCMG) in the 1927 Birthday Honours.

Vyner ran a hands-off and relatively popular administration that banned Christian missionaries and fostered indigenous traditions (to an extent: headhunting was outlawed).

=== World War II ===
Japanese forces landed at Miri, Sarawak on 16 December 1941, beginning an invasion of Borneo. In that same year, Vyner withdrew £200,000 from the Treasury for his personal expenses, in exchange for limiting his powers by a new constitution. Vyner and his family were visiting Sydney, where he would remain for the duration of the war.

== Abdication and later life ==
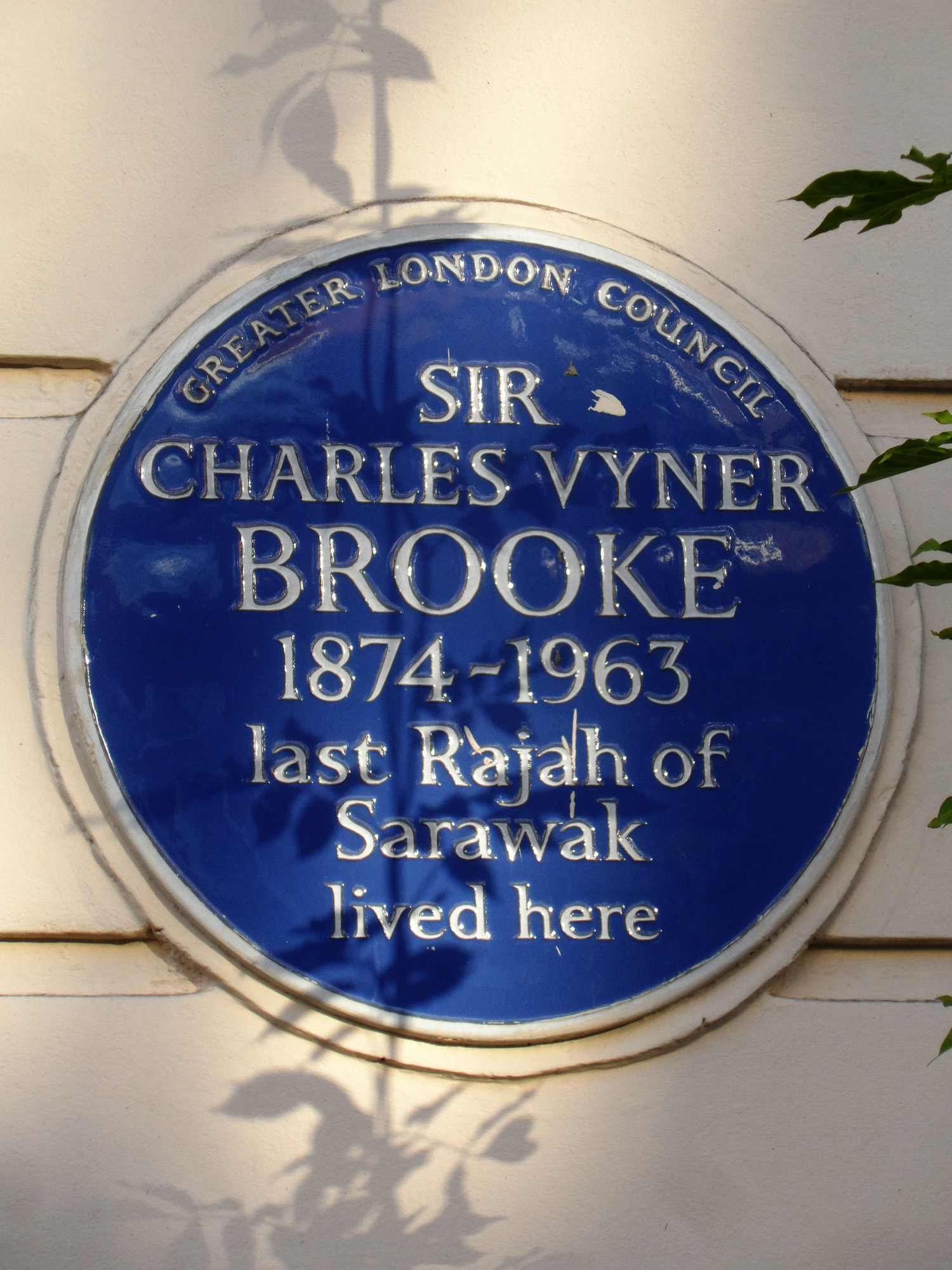
Blue plaque on Vyner's former house in Albion Street, London.

Vyner returned to Sarawak on 15 April 1946 and temporarily resumed power as Rajah, until 1 July 1946 when he ceded Sarawak to the British government as a Crown colony, thus ending White Rajah rule in Sarawak. Vyner died in London at No. 13, Albion Street, Bayswater, W2 on 9 May 1963, four months before Sarawak, Malaya, North Borneo and Singapore joined to form the Federation of Malaysia on 16 September 1963.

His nephew, Anthony Brooke, served in Sarawak in various departments in the civil service including the Land and Registry Office, and as a magistrate. Since 1937 he had also been Rajah Muda (crown prince) of Sarawak, because Vyner had three daughters but no son. Anthony opposed cession to Britain, as did a majority of the native members of the Council Negri (Parliament), and they campaigned against it for five years.

The anti-cession movement of Sarawak came to a head in 1948 when the second British governor to Sarawak, Duncan Stewart, was assassinated by a young nationalist named Rosli Dhobi in Sibu. Suspicion fell on Anthony for orchestrating the killing but declassified documents from the British National Archive later showed that he had no connection to the plot.

Vyner, his father, his brother Bertram, the Tuan Muda, and Rajah James, are buried in St Leonard's Church in the village of Sheepstor on Dartmoor, Devon.

== Family ==
He had three daughters, whose names could be preceded by the Malay honorific of Dayang (Lady):

- Leonora Margaret, Countess of Inchcape, wife of the 2nd Earl of Inchcape (one son, Lord Tanlaw, and one daughter) and, after his death, of US Colonel Francis Parker Tompkins (one son).
- Elizabeth, born in London, September 2, 1913, a Royal Academy of Dramatic Art-educated singer and actress, wife of firstly Harry Roy (one son and one daughter), and secondly, Julian Richards Vidmer. She died March 14, 2002, at Redington Shores, Florida.
- Nancy Valerie, an actress, known for The Charge of the Light Brigade, wife of firstly, Robert Gregory, an American wrestler; secondly, José Pepi Cabarro – a Spanish businessman; thirdly, Andrew Aitken Macnair (one son, Stewart, born 1952); and fourthly, Memery Whyatt. She died in Florida.

== Honours ==
- Raj of Sarawak
  - Sovereign of the Order of the Star of Sarawak (26 June 1929)
- United Kingdom
  - Knight Grand Cross of the Order of St Michael and St George (GCMG) (3 June 1927)

== Legacy ==
The ship SS Vyner Brooke was named after him.

A species of lizard endemic to Sarawak, Dasia vyneri, is named in his honor.

Charles Vyner Brooke Brooke family Born: 26 September 1874 Died: 9 May 1963
Regnal titles
Preceded by Charles	Rajah of Sarawak; 1917–1946	Monarchy abolished Sarawak becomes a crown colony
Preceded by Charles	Head of Government of Sarawak; 1917–1946	Succeeded by Charles Arden-Clarke as Governor of Sarawak
Titles in pretence
Loss of title Monarchy abolished	— TITULAR — Rajah of Sarawak; 1946–1963	Succeeded by Anthony Brooke
