= Duncan Stewart (colonial administrator) =

British colonial administrator

Duncan Stewart CMG

2nd Governor of Sarawak
- In office 15 November 1949 – 10 December 1949
- Monarch: George VI
- Preceded by: Charles Arden-Clarke
- Succeeded by: Anthony Abell

Personal details
- Born: Duncan George Stewart; 22 October 1904 Witkleifontein, Heidelberg, Transvaal Colony (present-day Gauteng, South Africa)
- Died: 10 December 1949 (aged 45) Singapore, Straits Settlements

Duncan George Stewart CMG (22 October 1904 – 10 December 1949) was a British colonial administrator and governor. He was mortally wounded in an assassination on 3 December 1949, in Sibu, Sarawak.

== Early life ==
Stewart was born in Witkleifontein on 22 October 1904 in the Transvaal Colony (now part of South Africa) to expatriate Britons who were posted in that area and was educated in England at Winchester College and Oriel College, Oxford, where he graduated with a BA.

== Career ==
Stewart joined the Colonial Administration Service (CAS) in 1928, and held positions as district officer at Oya Territory, Nigeria, colonial secretary in the Bahamas, secretary of finance in Mandatory Palestine, and secretary of the governorial conference in South Africa. He was married and had three children.

His service record was viewed as exceptional, and because of that, he was later announced as the new governor and commander-in-chief for Sarawak by Lord Listowel, minister of state for colonial affairs, to replace Charles Arden-Clarke.

== Assassination ==
Stewart had only been the Governor of Sarawak for a couple of weeks and was on his first official visit in the colony, to the town of Sibu on 3 December 1949. According to press reports of the event he was warmly welcomed by large crowds, who all seemed to be enjoying themselves. After inspecting an honour guard and meeting a group of school children, a youth (Moshidi bin Sedek) walked towards him holding a camera claiming to want a picture. As Stewart posed, another youth, Rosli Dhobi stabbed him. Both youths were immediately arrested.

Despite suffering a deep stab wound, Stewart is reported to have tried to carry on until blood began to seep through his white uniform. He was then quickly rushed away for treatment in Kuching but died a few days later after being flown to the General Hospital in Singapore.

The two youths were convicted of the murder and hanged with two other conspirators. Both were believed to be members of the anti-cession movement, and dedicated to restoring Anthony Brooke to the throne of Sarawak. In reality they were both from a political group agitating for union with newly independent Indonesia. Documents released in the late 20th century indicate that the British Government knew that Brooke was not involved, but chose not to reveal the truth of the matter so as not to provoke Indonesia. It had recently won its war of independence from the Netherlands, and the UK was already dealing with the Malayan Emergency to the north-west.

== Awards and honours ==
In 1948, Stewart was made a companion of the Order of St Michael and St George.

Government offices
Preceded by Sir Charles Arden-Clarke	Governor of Sarawak; 1949	Succeeded by Sir Anthony Abell
