= Anthony Brooke =

- Rajah Muda of Sarawak
- The Rajah Muda of Sarawak at Eton
- Born: Anthony Walter Dayrell Brooke; 10 December 1912
- Died: 2 March 2011 (aged 98); Wanganui, New Zealand
- Burial: Brooke Family Graveyard, Kuching, Sarawak, Malaysia
- Spouse: Kathleen Mary Hudden (div. 1965); Brigitte Keller (m. 1982–2011)
- Issue: James Brooke; Angela Brooke; Celia Brooke
- Father: Bertram Brooke
- Mother: Gladys Milton Palmer

Anthony Walter Dayrell Brooke (10 December 1912 – 2 March 2011) was proclaimed the Rajah Muda (heir apparent; Malay: Yang Amat Mulia Rajah Muda Sarawak) on 25 March 1939, by his uncle, Rajah of Sarawak, Charles Vyner Brooke, the third and last ruling White Rajah. Later in his life he was a peace activist founding the organisation Operation Peace Through Unity. He died in Whanganui, New Zealand.

Brooke was the son of Bertram, Tuan Muda of Sarawak and Gladys Milton Palmer, daughter of Sir Walter Palmer, 1st Baronet, and heir to part of the Huntley & Palmers biscuit fortune.

== Background ==
Anthony Brooke grew up in Britain and was educated at Eton College; Trinity College, Cambridge; and the School of African and Oriental Studies, University of London. Throughout the 1930s he served the Sarawak civil service in various sectors, including the Land and Registry Department, and as a magistrate.

Brooke was proclaimed Rajah Muda of Sarawak on 25 March 1939 and was granted the personal style of His Highness. Having been responsible for administering Sarawak between 1939 and 1940, in the absence of the Rajah, he was deprived of his styles and titles on 17 January 1940, over his marriage to a commoner, Kathleen Hudden, sister of a Sarawak government official. Anthony Brooke was restored as Rajah Muda conditionally on a 5 year probationary period in April 1941, but then dismissed and expelled from the state in September 1941, for objecting to various aspects of a proposed new constitution.

He enlisted in the British Army as a private soldier in November 1941, during the Second World War, and from 1941 to 1944 served as a lieutenant in the Intelligence Corps on the staff of the South East Asia Command at Kandy, Ceylon. He was special commissioner for Sarawak in the United Kingdom from 1944 to 1945.

In 1944, Brooke was restored as Rajah Muda, after consultations between his uncle and father. He was, however, deprived of his titles again on 12 October 1945. This was due to Anthony Brooke, along with other Sarawkian officials, coming out against proposals to cede Sarawak to the United Kingdom. Rajah Charles Vyner Brooke then took full control of negotiations.

On 24 October 1945, Charles Vyner Brooke made an agreement to cede Sarawak to the British, dependent upon getting approval from the Sarawak Government Supreme Council. Anthony Brooke, the designated heir, initially opposed the cession to the Crown, along with a majority of the native members of the Council Negri (Parliament), but due to the European vote the Cession Bill was carried by a vote of 19 to 16. A five-year campaign in Sarawak followed, aimed at revoking the country's new colonial status, in part directed by Brooke from his house in Singapore. In 1948, after the second British governor of Sarawak, Duncan Stewart, was assassinated by the Malay Sarawakian nationalist Rosli Dhobie, Brooke came under scrutiny by MI5, the British intelligence agency, who wanted to "get wind of any other plots he and his associates might be hatching". No evidence was found that he had known of the assassination plot. In 2012, a declassified document from the British National Archive showed that Brooke had had no connection with the assassination of Stewart and that the British government had known this at the time. This was not revealed at the time as the assassins were found to be agitating for union with newly independent Indonesia and the British government did not want to provoke Indonesia which had only recently won its war of independence from the Netherlands, and the UK was already dealing with the Malayan Emergency to the north-west.

In 1951, Brooke withdrew from the independence campaign, although according to some loyalists he remained the pretender to the throne.

Brooke and his wife Gita Brooke founded Operation Peace Through Unity (OPTU) in Sweden in 1975. From 1987 until Brooke's death in 2011 they lived together in Wanganui, New Zealand.

Brooke was a traveller and lecturer, supporting various movements for peace and universal understanding.

In 2013, the acting British high commissioner to Malaysia attended Brooke's reburial in Sarawak and offered an apology on behalf of Great Britain, clearing Anthony Brooke's name of any involvement.

== Personal life ==
Brooke was married firstly, in Rangoon, Burma, to Kathleen Mary Hudden (1907–1981), daughter of William Edward Cecil Hudden, Esq., of Backwell, Somerset, who became the Ranee Muda of Sarawak. They had three children:

- James Bertram Lionel Brooke (16 August 1940 – 27 May 2017) was a Life Member of the Sarawak Association, Chairman of the Brooke Heritage Trust, and a Fellow of the Royal Asiatic Society. He married, firstly, Victoria Holdsworth (born 1949) (she would later marry Sir Paul Getty), married secondly Karen Mary Lappin (born 1955). He had two sons by his second wife and lived in Edinburgh:
  - Laurence Nicholas Brooke (born 1983 in London), was educated at Bruntsfield Primary School, Edinburgh, and The High School, Dublin.
  - Jason Desmond Anthony Brooke (born 1985 in London), was also educated at Bruntsfield and The High School, Dublin. Received a BA degree in English literature from University College Dublin and an MPhil in International Conflict Studies from Trinity College, Dublin. He had married Kate Marie Brook and has two children.
    - Jago Charles Bertram Brooke
    - Charles Argus Michael Brooke
- Angela Carole Brooke (1942–1986)
- Celia Margaret Brooke (3 November 1944 – 17 December 2011), married first to David Ray Harper Inayat Khan (grandson of Pir-o-Murshid Hazrat Inayat Khan), married secondly Marcel Captier of Rennes le Chateau. She had a daughter by her first husband:
  - Sura Brooke Harper, who has two sons
    - Leandro Kubilay
    - James Ray

Anthony Brooke lived for various periods in London, in Sussex, and at Findhorn community in Scotland. In 1982, he married secondly a fellow peace activist: Brigitte (Gita) Keller (born in 1931 in Copenhagen to the Reverend Paul H. Lange), who took his name and became known as Gita Brooke.

== Death ==
Brooke died at his home, Rumah Brooke, in Wanganui on 2 March 2011, at the age of 98. His death coincided with the anniversary of the deaths of two of the four members of the Sarawak Anti-Cession Movement, Rosli Dhoby and Awang Ramli Amit, who were hanged at Kuching Central Prison on 2 March 1950, while the two others, Bujang Suntong and Morshidi Sidek, were hanged on 27 March.

The Brooke Heritage Trust stated that Brooke's ashes would be buried, per his last wish, at the Brooke Family Graveyard, near Fort Margherita in Sarawak, on 21 September 2013. His ashes travelled to Sarawak in an urn made by Whanganui potter Ross Mitchell-Anyon. On the stated date, the International Day of Peace, in a private ceremony attended by Brooke's widow Gita, his grandson Jason Brooke, British Deputy High Commissioner Ray Kyles, and New Zealand High Commissioner David Pine, Brooke's ashes were buried near Fort Margherita.

Anthony Brooke Brooke family Born: 10 December 1912 Died: 2 March 2011
Preceded by Bertram Brooke	Heir to the Kingdom of Sarawak; 25 August 1937 – 12 October 1945	Succeeded by Monarchy abolished
Titles in pretence
Preceded by Charles Vyner Brooke	— TITULAR — Rajah of Sarawak; 9 May 1963 – 2 March 2011; Reason for succession failure: sovereignty annexed in 1946	Succeeded by James Brooke
