= Frederick Le Gros Clark =

Frederick Le Gros Clark may refer to:

- Frederick Le Gros Clark (author), British children's author and an expert on malnutrition
- Frederick Le Gros Clark (surgeon), British surgeon

== See also ==
- Frederick Clark (disambiguation)
