= Ong Tiang Swee =

Businessman and philanthropist in Sarawak

Kapitan China Ong Tiang Swee OBE, CSS
- 王長水
- Born: Ong Tiang Swee; 3 August 1864; Kuching, Sarawak
- Died: 19 October 1950 (aged 86); Kuching, Colony of Sarawak
- Occupations: Businessman; Community Leader
- Spouse: Chan Hua Kheng
- Children: 14, including Ong Kwan Hin
- Parent(s): Ong Ewe Hai (Father); Teo Soo Neo (Mother)
- Relatives: Great-grandchild: Chef Wan

Kapitan China Ong Tiang Swee, OBE, CSS (Chinese: 王長水; pinyin: Wáng Chángshuǐ; Pe̍h-ōe-jī: Ông Tiâng-súi; 3 August 1864 – 19 October 1950) known as the Grand Old Man, was a renowned businessman and philanthropist in Sarawak. Regarded as the most prominent and successful Chinese community leader in Sarawak, he was Kapitan China of Sarawak and President of the Chinese Chamber of Commerce, as well as an advisor on Chinese Affairs and confidant to Rajah Charles Brooke. He was also the first Chinese nominated to the Sarawak Council Negri (Legislative Council) in 1937. He played a significant role in the progress of the state and saw Sarawak through its infant stages of development.

== Family History ==
Ong was the son of Ong Ewe Hai (1830-1889), a leading Sarawakian merchant and Rajah Charles Brooke's advisor on Chinese Affairs, and also confidant.

Generations of the Ong family played a prominent role for the Hokkien community in Sarawak. His father, Ong Ewe Hai was a prominent Kapitan China to the Hokkien community of Sarawak, and a successful businessman in multiple fields. His son, Ong Kwan Hin later succeeded him as Kapitan China. Both Ong Tiang Swee and Ong Kwan Hin were the first two Chinese people nominated to the Sarawak Council Negri (Legislative Council) in 1937. His son-in-law, Wee Kheng Chiang, established Bian Chang Bank (later merged as part of CIMB Group) in Kuching, Sarawak, and later established the United Chinese Bank with six other partners, today known as the United Overseas Bank (UOB). His grandson, Ong Kee Hui, also went into business and subsequently public service, where he co-founded the Sarawak United People's Party (SUPP), Sarawak's first political party in 1959. Kee Hui later served as the Minister of Local Government and Housing, and established the Ministry of Science Technology & Environment under Tun Razak's Cabinet.

Little is known of Ong's childhood as much of the family records were destroyed in the chaos of the Japanese occupation of Sarawak during World War II. His grandfather migrated from Fujian Province, China, to Singapore in the first half of the 19th century and subsequently to Kuching. His father, Ong Ewe Hai, arrived in Sarawak in 1846, a few years after the Sultan of Brunei ceded it to James Brooke, the first of the White Rajahs.

== Early life ==
Ong was born in Kuching on 3 August 1864. He had his early education at St Thomas School, which was one of the few mission schools in Sarawak at the time. To complete his education, he spent another two years in Singapore.

== Career ==
In 1882, he joined his father's firm, Ong Ewe Hai & Company, which became the leading trading firm in Kuching. Among other trading activities, the firm held the opium and arrack revenues for many years. It also processed and exported sago using its own factories and fleet of schooners.

Five years later, he became the director of the Sarawak and Singapore Steamship Company, which played a major role in their economic development of the state, as well as providing the main link with the outside world through Singapore. In the same year, he began his public service contributions when he became a member of the Chamber of Commerce. His advice and experience were always at the disposal of the government.

In 1914, Rajah Sir Charles Johnson Brooke set up the Sarawak Farms Syndicate, a joint venture between the government and the Chinese businessmen, to run the lucrative gambling and opium monopolies and the arak distilleries. Ong was made chairman of the syndicate with his son-in-law, Wee, made manager. The syndicate later closed down due to the Geneva Convention 1924.

In 1919, he was made Chairman of the Sarawak Steamship Company. Apart from these posts, Ong participated actively on educational matters, as he realised what education could do to accelerate the progress and development of the state.

One of the most distinctive features of Sarawakian life under the rule of both Charles and Vyner Brooke was horse racing. Ong was involved in the formation of the Sarawak Turf Club in 1924, becoming an honorary member. He was also judge, steward and committee member of the Club, from 1908 to 1928. Through his activities in horse racing, Ong has helped to bring the various ethnic groups in Sarawak at the time together.

Ong also set up the Sarawak Chinese Banking Corporation, the first Chinese bank in Sarawak, together with Chan. The bank was later dissolved due to the Great Depression.

=== Rise as Kapitan China ===
By 1888, Ong was already a leading figure in Sarawak. After his father's passing in 1889, Ong succeeded his father as Kapitan China of the Chinese community. It was his duty to manage the wellbeing of the community, as well as to advise the government on Chinese customs and affairs. Ong was also the intermediary between the government and his community, explaining new policies and laws of the government. The Rajah's government administered the Chinese indirectly through Ong, in his capacity as Kapitan. He served for over half a century as Kapitan Cina, when political parties and direct elections to the legislative bodies were still many years away.

He contributed substantially towards the development of the state under the White Rajahs' rule, when the growing Chinese community was participating actively in promoting the country's economy. The Rajah assisted with land, finance and building materials.

In February 1912, the Chinese Court was established to give the Chinese in Sarawak a more extended influence in the political affairs of the country. As such, it became the most influential body in the Chinese community. Ong was appointed President of the Court, which signified his supreme position in the Chinese hierarchy. When Ong stepped down in 1920, the Court was dissolved and its duties taken over by the civil courts, where Ong was an adviser.

As chairman of the Hokkien Association, Ong rallied support from the Chinese Community, particularly the Hokkien, for the establishment of the Hokkien Free School, which emphasised the teaching of the Chinese, rather than English.

In 1941, he was appointed a lifetime member of the Supreme Council.

In early 1946 Ong in his capacity as a Chinese community leader met Gerard MacBryan, who represented Sarawak Rajah Charles Vyner Brooke, to discuss the cession of Sarawak to the United Kingdom.

In 1947, the government appointed his son, Ong Kwan Hin to succeed him as Kapitan Cina for the Hokkien community.

== War Efforts ==
When World War I broke out in Europe in 1914, Ong was nominated to serve on the Food Control Committee, to ensure sufficient supply of foodstuff, and it was due largely to his activities that the Chinese responded to generously to the various war charities.

== Honours ==
The first appointment to the newly created Order of the Star of Sarawak, as a Companion of the Order, was made to him on 26 September 1928. He was the first man in Sarawak to receive this honour.

On 16 August 1947, he was made an Officer of the Order of the British Empire (OBE), presented by the first Governor of Sarawak, Sir Charles Arden Clarke.

In Kuching, there is a road named after him, called Jalan Ong Tiang Swee, which was awarded by the Rajah in recognition of his contributions.

There are a total of six roads in Kuching, Sarawak named after generations of the Ong family, mostly by the Rajah in recognition of their contribution to the community. These include Jalan Ewe Hai (also Ewe Hai street), Jalan Ong Kwan Hin, Jalan Tan Sri Ong Kee Hui, Jalan Hui Sing and Jalan Ong Hup Leong, a branch road of Jalan Ong Tiang Swee.

== Personal life ==
At 21 years old, Ong married for the first time but his wife died two years later. He then married Chan Hua Kheng. He was succeeded by 7 sons, one of whom is Ong Kwan Hin, and 3 daughters.

He died on 19 October 1950. A state funeral was held with a procession which proceeded from Rock Road to Mosque Road. It was attended by prominent British political figures and state dignitaries, leading businessmen and thousands of people from all walks of life who walked in the procession to pay their last respects to him. He was subsequently buried at the family burial ground in Batu Kinyang, Kuching, Sarawak (today's Rock Road within the Batu Lintang suburb). He also have a great grandson which was a famous chef in Malaysia, chef wan
