= Frederick Clark =

Frederick or Fred Clark may refer to:

- Frederick Scotson Clark (1840–1883), English organist and composer
- Frederick W. Clark (1857–1916), American engineer and businessman
- F. Ambrose Clark (1880–1964), American equestrian heir
- Patrick Clark (bishop) (Frederick Patrick Clark, 1908–1954), Canadian Anglican bishop
- Fred Clark (1914–1968), American character actor
- H. Fred Clark (1937–2012), American pediatrician and vaccinologist
- Fred Clark (politician) (born 1959), American member of Wisconsin State Assembly
- Frederick Le Gros Clark (author), British children's author and an expert on malnutrition
- Frederick Le Gros Clark (surgeon), British surgeon

== See also ==
- Frederick Clarke (disambiguation)
