= Ong Ewe Hai =

Businessman and community leader in Sarawak

Kapitan China Ong Ewe Hai
- 王有海
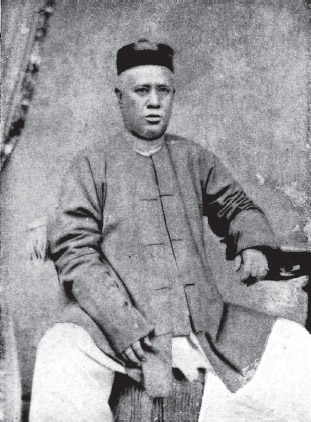
- Born: Ong Ewe Hin c. 1830; Singapore, Straits Settlements
- Died: 9 June 1888 (aged 57–58); Kuching, Raj of Sarawak
- Occupations: Businessman; Community Leader
- Spouse(s): Yeo Swee Kim, Teo Soo Neo
- Children: 18, including Ong Tiang Swee
- Parent: Ong Khoon Tian (Father)

Kapitan China Ong Ewe Hai (Chinese: 王有海; pinyin: Wáng Yǒuhǎi; c.1830–9 June 1888), was a prominent businessman and community leader in Sarawak.

== Family history ==
Generations of the Ong family played a prominent role for the Hokkien community in Sarawak. Ong himself was a prominent Kapitan Cina to the Hokkien community of Sarawak, and a successful businessman in multiple fields. His son, Ong Tiang Swee also succeeded him as Kapitan Cina, and subsequently, his grandson, Ong Kwan Hin. Both Ong Tiang Swee and Ong Kwan Hin were the first two Chinese people nominated to the Sarawak Council Negri (Legislative Council) in 1937. His great-grandson, Ong Kee Hui, also went into business and subsequently public service, where he co-founded the Sarawak United People's Party (SUPP), Sarawak's first political party in 1959. Kee Hui later served as the Minister of Local Government and Housing, and established the Ministry of Science Technology & Environment under Tun Razak's Cabinet, serving as a Federal Minister.

== Early life ==
Ong set foot in Sarawak 1846 when he was merely 16. Remarkably, he arrived from Singapore where he was born in 1830 not as a labourer as many of his age did then, but as a trader.

Circumstances forced the young Ong to venture into business early in life because his father, Ong Khoon Tian, had left him and his siblings impoverished when he died when Ong himself was seven.

He received very little education because being the eldest sibling, he had to help support his family from an early age.

== Career ==
Venturing into business at such a young age, he had to turn to an older man, Lim Eng Moh, for guidance. His mentor told of good business opportunities in barter-trading with the natives of Sarawak. Throwing caution to the wind, he joined Lim in setting out to the newly-established state of Sarawak to seek his fortune.

He gained the friendship of a local chief in Kuching and with credit granted by Singaporean companies, he became very successful. Within 10 years, he established two firms, Kay Cheang, Ewe Hai & Co in Singapore and Ewe Hai, Moh & Co in Kuching. In 1872, he consolidated the two firms into Ewe Hai & Co, turning it into one of the leading companies in Sarawak. One of the firm's main businesses was transporting sago starch from Mukah to Kuching, pre-processed and also the trade of gambier and pepper.

The success of his export business subsequently brought him closer to the first Rajah, whose government relied largely on export taxes. His close relationship Sir James Brooke earned Ewe Hai the appointment of Kapitan Cina.

In 1857, he warned the Rajah of the dissatisfaction of the Hakkas in Bau and the danger of an uprising but the latter paid no heed. It was a costly blunder which nearly cost the Rajah his life as the Chinese insurrection took place soon after Ong's warning.

=== Religious Work ===
Ong devoted much of his life to the Taoism. He was a patron and guardian of all Buddhist and Taoist temples in the then First Division in Sarawak. He was also a staunch Buddhist and had chaired many charitable and religious organisations.

== Honours ==
After the great Kuching fire sometime in 1885 or 1886, Ong rebuilt Ewe Hai Street. He named it after himself but left out his surname out of respect for the Rajah because Ong means King in Hokkien. It joins Carpenter Street from its junction with Bishopsgate Street to Wayang Street. Today, it is a preserved heritage site in Kuching.

There is a total of six roads in Kuching, Sarawak named after generations of the Ong family, mostly by the Rajah in recognition of their contribution to the community. These include Jalan Ewe Hai (also Ewe Hai street), Jalan Ong Kwan Hin, Jalan Ong Kee Hui, Jalan Hui Sing and Jalan Ong Hup Leong, a branch road of Jalan Ong Tiang Swee.

== Personal life ==
Ong married a nyonya, Yeo Swee Kim, in Singapore and that branch of his family went on to become very successful in their pursuits. He later married another lady, Teo Soo Neo, a Hakka from Lundu and started another family in Sarawak.

When Ong decided to plant his roots in Kuching, he strategically built his house to overlook the Sarawak River. When it was completed in 1885, it not only overlooked the river but also Ewe Hai Street, where shophouses were built on both sides of it. It was later sold to the Anglican Mission for a few thousand dollars and turned into a boarding house in 1933. The structure still exists to this day and has since been converted into a boutique hotel, The Marian Boutique Lodging House.

He never forgot his Singaporean roots, and probably intended to retire there as he built a fine residence which he called Bonnie Grass. He died in 1889 at 59 years old before the completion of the house.
