= Cyril Drummond Le Gros Clark =

British colonial administrator (1908–1958)

Cyril Le Gros Clark MSS
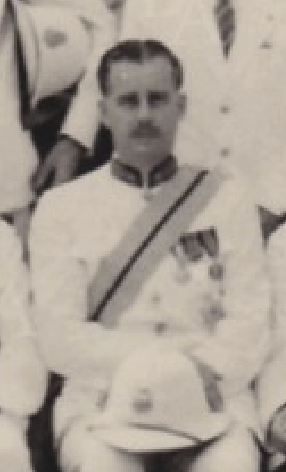
- Le Gros Clark in late 1941

Chief Secretary of Sarawak
- In office 2 May 1941 – 25 December 1941
- Monarch: Charles Vyner Brooke
- Preceded by: John Beville Archer
- Succeeded by: John Beville Archer

Personal details
- Born: 1894
- Died: 6 July 1945 (aged 50–51) Keningau, North Borneo
- Resting place: Kota Kinabalu, Sabah
- Citizenship: British
- Spouse: Averil Mackenzie-Grieve (m. 1925)
- Parents: Edward Travers Clark (father); Ethel May (mother)
- Relatives: Frederick Le Gros Clark (grandfather); Wilfrid Le Gros Clark (younger brother); Frederick Le Gros Clark (older brother)
- Education: King's College

Military service
- Branch/service: British Army
- Years of service: 1914–1923
- Rank: Major
- Unit: 17th Horse Regiment; Desert Mounted Corps; Indian Army
- Battles/wars: World War I Battle of Jerusalem

Cyril Drummond Le Gros Clark (1894 - 6 July 1945) was a British military officer, sinologist, and civil servant. He served as Chief Secretary of Sarawak from 1941 until his execution by the Japanese in 1945.

== Early life, family and education ==
Born in 1894, his grandfather was Frederick Le Gros Clark, a surgeon and member of both the Royal Society and Royal College of Surgeons. His brothers were emininent anatomist Wilfrid, and author Frederick. He attended King's College and graduated in 1914 at age 20.

In 1921, he was briefly engaged to a daughter of American diplomat Henry Van Dyke. He married artist Averil Mackenzie-Grieve in 1925. Averil would remarry after Cyril's death to medical historian John Joyce Keevil.

== Military service ==
After finishing school, he obtained an officer's commission in 1914 and was wounded in France in 1915. After recovering, he graduated from the Army Staff College with distinction in Wellington, Tamil Nadu, after which he joined the 17th Horse Regiment. He was later seconded to the Desert Mounted Corps where he took part in the Middle Eastern front of the First World War. It was with the Desert Mounted Corps that he participated in the 1917 Battle of Jerusalem against Ottoman forces. He retired from service in 1923.

== In Sarawak (1925 - 1941) ==
Le Gros Clark joined the Sarawak Civil Service in 1925. He was sent to study Hokkien in Xiamen, then called Amoy. He returned to Sarawak in 1928 and was appointed the Secretary of Chinese Affairs in the Raj government.

For the occasion of centennial celebration of the Brooke dynasty in Sarawak, Charles Vyner Brooke planned to create a modern constitution to begin the democratisation of Sarawak. On 31 March 1941, Le Gros Clark announced the Rajah's intent to transition Sarawak from an absolute monarchy to a democratic state with a modern constitution.

=== Work in Sinology ===
In 1931, he published his translations of works from the Song dynasty scholar-official Su Shi.

=== The Blue Report ===
In 1934, he was commissioned to write a report on the civil service and administration. The next year, he published The Blue Report that laid out various shortfalls in the Sarawak Civil Service, mostly pertaining to the generally poor performance of native officers, concluding that they must be given more responsibilities in administration.

=== Chief Secretary of Sarawak ===
On 2 May 1941, John Beville Archer retired as Chief Secretary, with Le Gros Clark being appointed as his replacement.

== Japanese Occupation of Sarawak ==
=== Prelude ===
Charles Vyner Brooke left Sarawak on 29 October for his year-end holiday to Australia, leaving the administration of the government to Le Gros Clark in his capacity as Chief Secretary.

== Prisoner of war ==
On Christmas Day, the Japanese captured Kuching. Most government officers including Le Gros Clark were kept at Kuching and later moved to the Batu Lintang Camp in July 1942. There, he served as the camp master from July 1942 to November 1944 in which he distributed news bulletins on his negotiations with the camp commander.

== Death ==
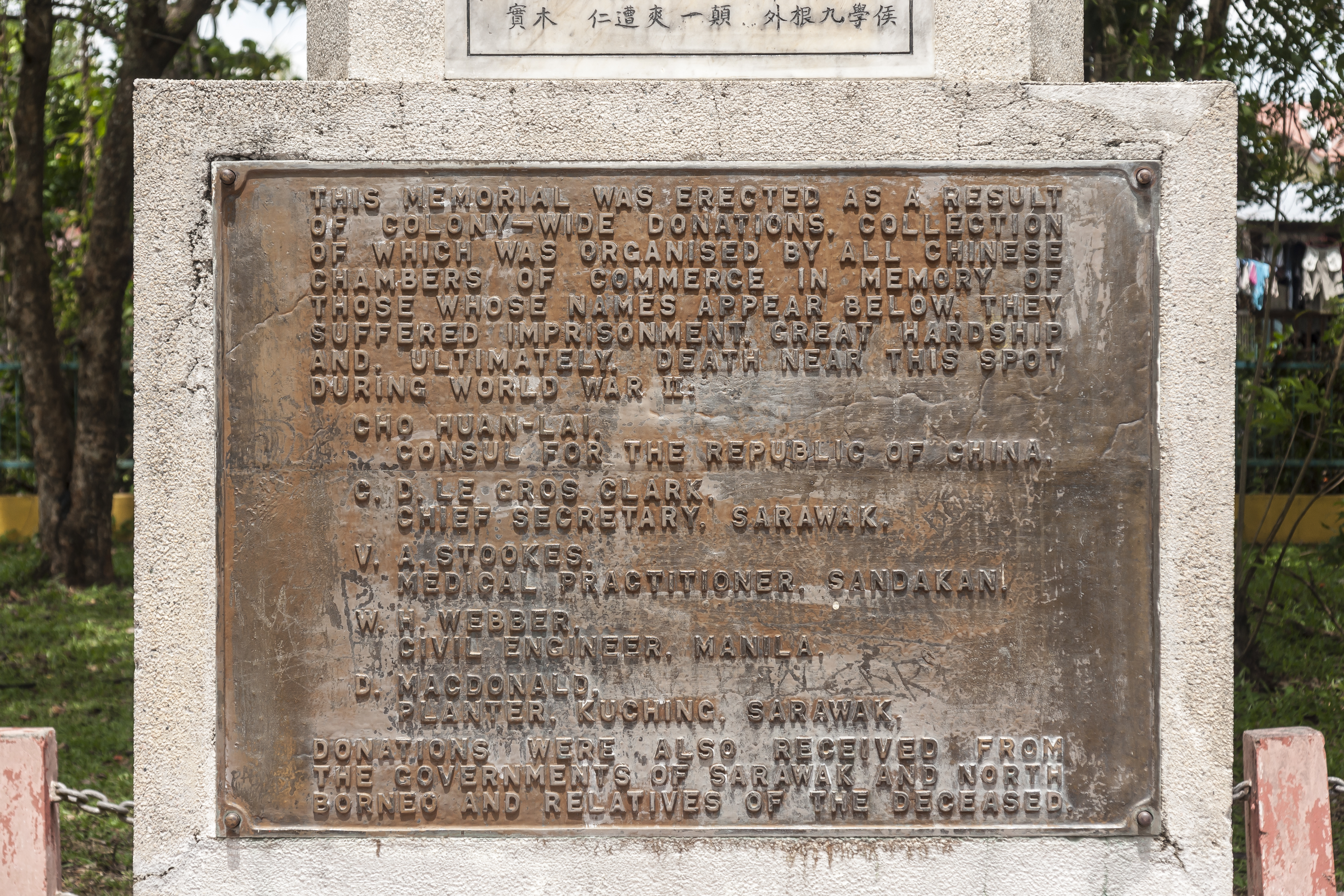
Cho Huan Lai Memorial with Le Gros Clark listed among the victims of the Keningau Executions

Le Gros Clark and four others were executed by the Japanese camp guards on 6 July 1945.

== Honours ==
=== Awards ===
- Raj of Sarawak
  - Master of the Order of the Star of Sarawak (MSS) (21 September 1941)
  - Companion of the Order of the Star of Sarawak (CSS) (31 March 1941)

=== Medals and decorations ===
- United Kingdom
  - 1914-1915 Star
  - British War Medal
  - Victory Medal 1914–19

== Works ==
- Selections from the Works of Su-Tung-P'o (1931) (ISBN 978-0404569617)
- The Blue Report (1935)

== Bibliography ==
- Cornwall Artists Index. (n.d.). Averil Salmond MacKenzie GRIEVE. Retrieved May 22, 2026, from https://cornwallartists.org/cornwall-artists/averil-salmond-mackenzie-grieve
- Ecke, G., & Erkes, E. (1947). Cyril Drummond le Gros Clark 1894–1945 [with reply]. Monumenta Serica, 12, 297–299. https://www.jstor.org/stable/40726683
- Miss Van Dyke to wed Capt. C. D. Le Gros Clark. (1921, May 18). The New York Times, 15. https://timesmachine.nytimes.com/timesmachine/1921/05/18/108638166.html
- Ooi, K. G. (Ed.). (1998). Japanese empire in the tropics: Selected documents and reports of the Japanese period in Sarawak, Northwest Borneo, 1941–1945 (Vol. 2). Ohio University Center for International Studies.
- Talib, N. S. (1999). Administrators and their service: The Sarawak administrative service under the Brooke Rajahs and British colonial rule. Oxford University Press. https://dokumen.pub/administrators-and-their-service-the-sarawak-administrative-service-under-the-brooke-rajahs-and-british-colonial-rule-9835600317-9789835600319.html
- The Sarawak Gazette. (1941, April 1). 71(1051). https://www.pustaka-sarawak.com/gazette/gazette_uploaded/1370917639.pdf
- The Sarawak Gazette. (1941, June 2). 71(1053). https://www.pustaka-sarawak.com/gazette/gazette_uploaded/1370917639.pdf
- The Sarawak Gazette. (1941, November 1). 71(1059). https://www.pustaka-sarawak.com/gazette/gazette_uploaded/1370918065.pdf
