= Minister of Science, Technology and Innovation (Malaysia) =

Minister in the Government of Malaysia

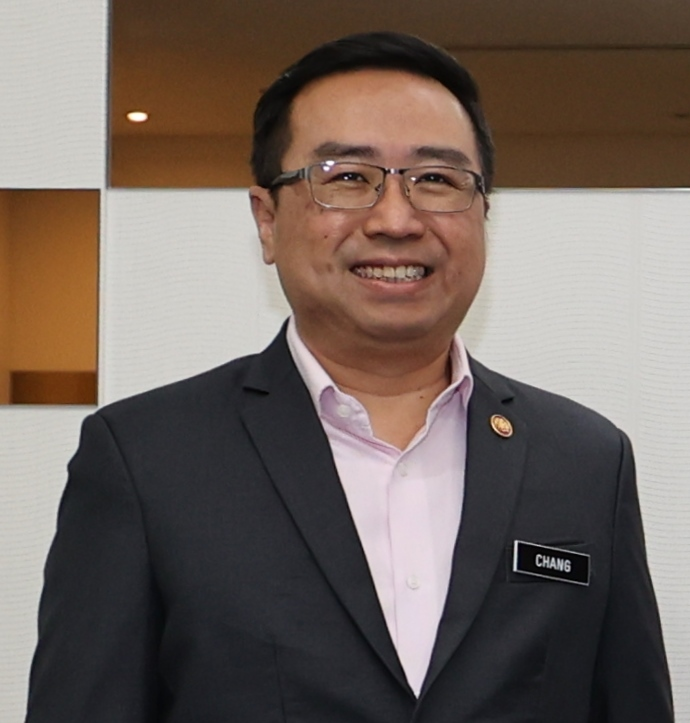
- Incumbent; Chang Lih Kang since 3 December 2022
- Ministry of Science, Technology and Innovation
- Style: Yang Berhormat Menteri (The Honourable Minister)
- Abbreviation: MOSTI
- Member of: Cabinet of Malaysia
- Reports to: Parliament of Malaysia
- Seat: Putrajaya
- Appointer: Yang di-Pertuan Agong on the recommendation of the Prime Minister of Malaysia
- Formation: 1970
- First holder: Ong Kee Hui (Minister of Technology, Research and Local Government)
- Deputy: Yusof Apdal
- Website: www.mosti.gov.my

The Minister of Science, Technology and Innovation has been Chang Lih Kang since 3 December 2022. He is deputised by Deputy Minister of Science, Technology and Innovation. The minister administers the portfolio through the Ministry of Science, Technology and Innovation.

== List of ministers ==
=== Technology ===
The following individuals have been appointed as Minister of Technology, or any of its precedent titles:

Political party: Alliance/BN PH

Portrait	Name (Birth–Death) Constituency	Political party	Title	Took office	Left office	Deputy Minister	Prime Minister (Cabinet)
	Ong Kee Hui (1914–2000); MP for Bandar Kuching	Alliance (SUPP)	Minister of Technology, Research and Local Government	1970	1972	Vacant	Abdul Razak Hussein (I)
	Lee San Choon (1935–2023); MP for Segamat Selatan	Alliance (MCA)	Minister of Technology, Research and Coordination of New Villages	1972	1974	Vacant	Abdul Razak Hussein (I)
	Mohamed Yaacob (1926–2009); MP for Tanah Merah	BN (UMNO)	Minister of Energy, Technology and Research	1974	1976	Vacant	Abdul Razak Hussein (II)
	Ong Kee Hui (1914–2000); MP for Bandar Kuching	BN (SUPP)	Minister of Science, Technology and Environment	1976	1982	Abdullah Ahmad (1976–1978); Vacant (1978–1979); Clarence Elong Mansul (1979–1981); Vacant (1981–1982)	Hussein Onn (I · II); Mahathir Mohamad (I)
	Stephen Yong Kuet Tze (1921–2001); MP for Padawan	BN (SUPP)	Minister of Science, Technology and Environment	1982	26 October 1990	Vacant (1982–1987); Law Hieng Ding (1979–1980)	Mahathir Mohamad (II · III)
	Law Hieng Ding (1935–2018); MP for Sarikei	BN (SUPP)	Minister of Science, Technology and Environment	27 October 1990	26 March 2004	Peter Chin Fah Kui (1990–1995); Abu Bakar Daud (1995–1999); Zainal Dahlan (1999–2004)	Mahathir Mohamad (IV · V · VI); Abdullah Ahmad Badawi (I)
	Jamaluddin Jarjis (1951–2015); MP for Rompin	BN (UMNO)	Minister of Science, Technology and Innovation	27 March 2004	18 March 2008	Kong Cho Ha	Abdullah Ahmad Badawi (II)
	Maximus Ongkili (b. 1953); MP for Kota Marudu	BN (PBS)	Minister of Science, Technology and Innovation	19 March 2008	15 May 2013	Fadillah Yusof	Abdullah Ahmad Badawi (III); Najib Razak (I)
	Ewon Ebin (b. 1954); MP for Ranau	BN (UPKO)	Minister of Science, Technology and Innovation	16 May 2013	29 July 2015	Abu Bakar Mohamad Diah	Najib Razak (II)
	Wilfred Madius Tangau (b. 1958); MP for Tuaran	BN (UPKO)	Minister of Science, Technology and Innovation	29 July 2015	9 May 2018	Abu Bakar Mohamad Diah	Najib Razak (II)
	Yeo Bee Yin (b. 1983); MP for Bakri	PH (DAP)	Minister of Energy, Science, Technology, Environment and Climate Change	2 July 2018	24 February 2020	Isnaraissah Munirah Majilis	Mahathir Mohamad (VII)
	Khairy Jamaluddin (b. 1976); MP for Rembau	BN (UMNO)	Minister of Science, Technology and Innovation	10 March 2020	16 August 2021	Ahmad Amzad Hashim	Muhyiddin Yassin (I)
	Adham Baba (b.1962); MP for Tenggara	BN (UMNO)	Minister of Science, Technology and Innovation	30 August 2021	24 November 2022	Ahmad Amzad Hashim	Ismail Sabri Yaakob (I)
	Chang Lih Kang (b. 1980); MP for Tanjong Malim	PH (PKR)	Minister of Science, Technology and Innovation	3 December 2022	Incumbent	Arthur Joseph Kurup (2022–2023); Yusof Apdal (2023–current)	Anwar Ibrahim (I)

=== Science ===
The following individuals have been appointed as Minister of Science, or any of its precedent titles:

Political party: BN PH

Portrait	Name (Birth–Death) Constituency	Political party	Title	Took office	Left office	Deputy Minister	Prime Minister (Cabinet)
	Ong Kee Hui (1914–2000); MP for Bandar Kuching	BN (SUPP)	Minister of Science, Technology and Environment	1976	1982	Abdullah Ahmad (1976–1978); Vacant (1978–1979); Clarence Elong Mansul (1979–1981); Vacant (1981–1982)	Hussein Onn (I · II); Mahathir Mohamad (I)
	Stephen Yong Kuet Tze (1921–2001); MP for Padawan	BN (SUPP)	Minister of Science, Technology and Environment	1982	26 October 1990	Vacant (1982–1987); Law Hieng Ding (1979–1980)	Mahathir Mohamad (II · III)
	Law Hieng Ding (1935–2018); MP for Sarikei	BN (SUPP)	Minister of Science, Technology and Environment	27 October 1990	26 March 2004	Peter Chin Fah Kui (1990–1995); Abu Bakar Daud (1995–1999); Zainal Dahlan (1999–2004)	Mahathir Mohamad (IV · V · VI); Abdullah Ahmad Badawi (I)
	Jamaluddin Jarjis (1951–2015); MP for Rompin	BN (UMNO)	Minister of Science, Technology and Innovation	27 March 2004	18 March 2008	Kong Cho Ha	Abdullah Ahmad Badawi (II)
	Maximus Ongkili (b. 1953); MP for Kota Marudu	BN (PBS)	Minister of Science, Technology and Innovation	19 March 2008	15 May 2013	Fadillah Yusof	Abdullah Ahmad Badawi (III); Najib Razak (I)
	Ewon Ebin (b. 1954); MP for Ranau	BN (UPKO)	Minister of Science, Technology and Innovation	16 May 2013	29 July 2015	Abu Bakar Mohamad Diah	Najib Razak (II)
	Wilfred Madius Tangau (b. 1958); MP for Tuaran	BN (UPKO)	Minister of Science, Technology and Innovation	29 July 2015	9 May 2018	Abu Bakar Mohamad Diah	Najib Razak (II)
	Yeo Bee Yin (b. 1983); MP for Bakri	PH (DAP)	Minister of Energy, Science, Technology, Environment and Climate Change	2 July 2018	24 February 2020	Isnaraissah Munirah Majilis	Mahathir Mohamad (VII)
	Khairy Jamaluddin (b. 1976); MP for Rembau	BN (UMNO)	Minister of Science, Technology and Innovation	10 March 2020	16 August 2021	Ahmad Amzad Hashim	Muhyiddin Yassin (I)
	Adham Baba (b.1962); MP for Tenggara	BN (UMNO)	Minister of Science, Technology and Innovation	30 August 2021	24 November 2022	Ahmad Amzad Hashim	Ismail Sabri Yaakob (I)
	Chang Lih Kang (b. 1980); MP for Tanjong Malim	PH (PKR)	Minister of Science, Technology and Innovation	3 December 2022	Incumbent	Arthur Joseph Kurup (2022–2023); Yusof Apdal (2023–current)	Anwar Ibrahim (I)

=== Innovation ===
The following individuals have been appointed as Minister of Innovation, or any of its precedent titles:

Political party: BN PH

Portrait	Name (Birth–Death) Constituency	Political party	Title	Took office	Left office	Deputy Minister	Prime Minister (Cabinet)
	Jamaluddin Jarjis (1951–2015); MP for Rompin	BN (UMNO)	Minister of Science, Technology and Innovation	27 March 2004	18 March 2008	Kong Cho Ha	Abdullah Ahmad Badawi (II)
	Maximus Ongkili (b. 1953); MP for Kota Marudu	BN (PBS)	Minister of Science, Technology and Innovation	19 March 2008	15 May 2013	Fadillah Yusof	Abdullah Ahmad Badawi (III); Najib Razak (I)
	Ewon Ebin (b. 1954); MP for Ranau	BN (UPKO)	Minister of Science, Technology and Innovation	16 May 2013	29 July 2015	Abu Bakar Mohamad Diah	Najib Razak (II)
	Wilfred Madius Tangau (b. 1958); MP for Tuaran	BN (UPKO)	Minister of Science, Technology and Innovation	29 July 2015	9 May 2018	Abu Bakar Mohamad Diah	Najib Razak (II)
	Khairy Jamaluddin (b. 1976); MP for Rembau	BN (UMNO)	Minister of Science, Technology and Innovation	10 March 2020	16 August 2021	Ahmad Amzad Hashim	Muhyiddin Yassin (I)
	Adham Baba (b.1962); MP for Tenggara	BN (UMNO)	Minister of Science, Technology and Innovation	30 August 2021	24 November 2022	Ahmad Amzad Hashim	Ismail Sabri Yaakob (I)
	Chang Lih Kang (b. 1980); MP for Tanjong Malim	PH (PKR)	Minister of Science, Technology and Innovation	3 December 2022	Incumbent	Arthur Joseph Kurup (2022–2023); Yusof Apdal (2023–current)	Anwar Ibrahim (I)

=== Research ===
The following individuals have been appointed as Minister of Research, or any of its precedent titles:

Political party: Alliance/BN

Portrait	Name (Birth–Death) Constituency	Political party	Title	Took office	Left office	Deputy Minister	Prime Minister (Cabinet)
	Ong Kee Hui (1914–2000); MP for Bandar Kuching	Alliance (SUPP)	Minister of Technology, Research and Local Government	1970	1972	Vacant	Abdul Razak Hussein (I)
	Lee San Choon (1935–2023); MP for Segamat Selatan	Alliance (MCA)	Minister of Technology, Research and Coordination of New Villages	1972	1974	Vacant	Abdul Razak Hussein (I)
	Mohamed Yaacob (1926–2009); MP for Tanah Merah	BN (UMNO)	Minister of Energy, Technology and Research	1974	1976	Vacant	Abdul Razak Hussein (II)

=== Green technology ===
The following individuals have been appointed as Minister of Green Technology, or any of its precedent titles:

Political party: BN

Portrait	Name (Birth–Death) Constituency	Political party	Title	Took office	Left office	Deputy Minister	Prime Minister (Cabinet)
	Peter Chin Fah Kui (b. 1945); MP for Miri	BN (SUPP)	Minister of Energy, Green Technology and Water	10 April 2009	15 May 2013	Noriah Kasnon	Najib Razak (I)
	Maximus Ongkili (b. 1953); MP for Kota Marudu	BN (PBS)	Minister of Energy, Green Technology and Water	16 May 2013	9 May 2018	Mahdzir Khalid (2013–2015); James Dawos Mamit (2015–2018)	Najib Razak (II)
