= Frederick Clarke =

Frederick, Freddie or Fred Clarke may refer to:

== Sport ==
- Fred Clarke (1872–1960), American baseball player
- Fred Clarke (Australian footballer) (1932–2020), Australian rules footballer for Richmond
- Fred Clarke (footballer, born 1941), Northern Irish defender
- Freddie Clarke (born 1992), English rugby union lock

== Others ==
- Sir Fred Clarke (educationist) (1880–1952), English director of the University of London Institute of Education
- F. A. S. Clarke (Frederick Arthur Stanley Clarke, 1892–1972), British brigadier who served in both World Wars
- Frederick J. Clarke (1915–2002), American lieutenant general with Army Corps of Engineers
- Frederick S. Clarke (1949–2000), American magazine publisher

== See also ==
- Frederick Clarke Withers (1828–1901), English architect in America
- Frederick Clarke Tate (1849–1920), Canadian legislator in Saskatchewan
- Frederick Clark (disambiguation)
