= Ong Kwan Hin =

Businessman in Sarawak (1896–1982)

Kapitan China Ong Kwan Hin
- 王觀興
- Born: Ong Kwan Hin; 4 June 1896; Kuching, Sarawak, British Empire
- Died: 1982 (aged 85–86); Kuching, Sarawak, Malaysia
- Occupations: Businessman; Community Leader
- Spouse: Wee Geok Sim
- Children: 13, including Ong Kee Hui
- Parent(s): Ong Tiang Swee (father, deceased); Chan Hua Kheng (mother, deceased)

Kapitan China Ong Kwan Hin (1896-1982) was a prominent businessman and community leader in Sarawak.

== Family history ==
Ong is the son of Ong Tiang Swee (1864-1950), renowned businessman and the most prominent and successful Chinese community leader in Sarawak.

Generations of the Ong family played a prominent role for the Hokkien community in Sarawak. His grandfather, Ong Ewe Hai was a prominent Kapitan Cina to the Hokkien community of Sarawak, and a successful businessman in multiple fields. His father, Ong Tiang Swee also succeeded him as Kapitan Cina. Both Ong Tiang Swee and Ong Kwan Hin were the first two Chinese people nominated to the Sarawak Council Negri (Legislative Council) in 1937. His son, Ong Kee Hui, also went into business and subsequently public service, where he co-founded the Sarawak United People's Party (SUPP), Sarawak's first political party in 1959. Kee Hui later served as the Minister of Local Government and Housing, and established the Ministry of Science Technology & Environment under Tun Razak's Cabinet, serving as a Federal Minister.

== Early life ==
Ong was born in Kuching on 4 June 1896. He was educated at St Thomas' School in Kuching.

His eldest brother Hap Hin passed on at a very young age due to illness, resulting in Ong becoming the patriarch of the family as soon as he was eligible.

== Career ==
Upon graduation, he joined his father's bank, and also took the post of cashier with the Sarawak Chinese Banking Corporation, the first Chinese bank in Sarawak.

In 1947, the Colonial Government appointed him as one of the Kapitan Cina representing the Hokkien community, succeeding his father, Ong Tiang Swee who later passed on in 1950.

His strong interest in animal husbandry led him to establish a dairy and poultry farm. His success resulted in his being made a Fellow of the Poultry Association of Great Britain.

He also established a business enterprise named Hiap Soon Hin at the Main Bazaar, the earliest and oldest agent for AIA Insurance, until he gave it up in the 1970s.

During those early post-World War II years, Ong became a leading member of many organisations. Together with other prominent business figures, he founded Kuching's United Merchant Association and served as its chairman for many years.

He was also a chairman of the supervisory board of Sarawak's Chamber of Commerce until he retired from his posts in this many other organisations in 1960. One of the positions he stepped down from then was as chairman of the Kuching Hokkien Association, a role which he served from 1948 to 1958.

He was also on the board of many charitable organisations such as Hun Nam Siang Tng.

== Honours ==
The British government recognised his years of community service by naming the road leading from (then) Golf-link Road to his house as Ong Kwan Hin Road.

There are a total of six roads in Kuching, Sarawak named after generations of the Ong family, mostly by the Rajah in recognition of their contribution to the community. These include Jalan Ewe Hai (also Ewe Hai street), Jalan Ong Kwan Hin, Jalan Tan Sri Ong Kee Hui, Jalan Hui Sing and Jalan Ong Hup Leong, a branch road of Jalan Ong Tiang Swee.

== Personal life ==
Ong devoted much of his life to the Taoist religion. He had an avid interest in Chinese temples, on which he became a recognised authority.

At the time of his death in 1982, he was survived by 10 children (7 sons, 3 daughters) along with their spouses and 57 grandchildren (32 grandsons and 25 granddaughters) together with their spouses, hence also to mourn his loss were dozens of his great-grandchildren and also great-great-grandchildren.
