= John Beville Archer =

British colonial administrator (1893–1948)

John Beville Archer CMG MSS

Chief Secretary of Sarawak
- In office 1 April 1939 – 2 May 1941
- Preceded by: Edward Parnell
- Succeeded by: Cyril Le Gros Clark
- In office 15 April 1946 – 1 July 1946
- Preceded by: Cyril Le Gros Clark
- Succeeded by: Christopher William Dawson

Personal details
- Born: 22 January 1893
- Died: 17 July 1948 (aged 55) Sarawak
- Occupation: Colonial administrator

John Beville Archer (22 January 1893 – 17 July 1948) was a British colonial administrator. He served as Chief Secretary of the Crown Colony of Sarawak twice, first from 1939 to 1941 and again from late 1945 to July 1946.

== Early life and education ==
Archer was born on 22 January 1893, the second son of Herbert Ray Archer, M.D., and Rosita Evelyn Elizabeth Beville . He was educated at Victoria College, Jersey and the training ship H.M.S. Worcester.

== Career ==
=== Raj of Sarawak ===
Archer joined the Sarawak Civil Service as a cadet in 1912, and served in various posts while also working on and off for many years as editor of the Sarawak Gazette. In 1920, he was the resident at Sadong before he was transferred to Oys later that year. In 1927, he was appointed a member of the Negri Council while also serving as district officer, Upper Sarawak and Lundu. In 1929, he was district officer, Kuching and coroner. Later that year, he was appointed the resident to the First Division; in 1930, he was transferred as resident to the Second Division; and in 1934, he was resident of the Fourth Division at Limbang.

In 1939, Archer was appointed Secretary for Internal Affairs, and then Chief Secretary of Sarawak, remaining in the post until 1941, when he resigned the position. On several occasions he served as officer administering the Government, and was also a member of the Supreme Council of Sarawak. While acting as officer administering the Government in 1941, Archer received the proclamation from Sir Charles Vyner Brooke, the Rajah of Sarawak, relinquishing his legislative powers. Considered the end of "absolute rule" in Sarawak, the proclamation vested legislative power to a committee of administration headed by Archer tasked with drafting a new constitution, "to facilitate the gradual development of a representative government on democratic principals."

Following the invasion of Borneo by the Japanese in 1941, Archer was captured by the Japanese and interned until 1945. After World War II, he served as political adviser to the British Military Administration in Sarawak, and on the restoration of civilian government in 1945, he was reappointed Chief Secretary of Sarawak, and sworn in as acting Governor of Sarawak. He retired from the service in 1946.

== Personal life and death ==
Archer married Dayang Jami-ah, daughter of Abang Bagap of Sarawak in 1941.

Archer died on 17 July 1948 in Sarawak, aged 55. He was found at his home with serious injuries from a gunshot wound, and was taken to hospital where he died the following day. At the inquest a verdict of suicide was returned.

== Honours ==
Archer was appointed Companion of the Order of St Michael and St George (CMG) in the 1947 New Year Honours. In 1941, he was appointed Master First Class (MSS) of the Order of the Star of Sarawak.

== Bibliography ==
- Talib, N. S. (1999). Administrators and their service: The Sarawak administrative service under the Brooke Rajahs and British colonial rule. Oxford University Press. https://dokumen.pub/administrators-and-their-service-the-sarawak-administrative-service-under-the-brooke-rajahs-and-british-colonial-rule-9835600317-9789835600319.html
- The Sarawak Gazette (1971, November 30). 97(1365). https://www.pustaka-sarawak.com/gazette/gazette_uploaded/1404377812.pdf
