= Order of the Star of Sarawak =

Awarded by The Rajah of Sarawak
- Type: Order
- Motto: HARAPLAH SA-LAGI BERNAFAS (As long as I breathe, I hope)
- Awarded for: to recognise exceptional services by the Sarawak subjects and Foreigners alike to the State of Sarawak
- Status: Not Awarded since 1946; Dormant order since 2006
- Rajah: Charles Vyner Brooke
- Grades: Master (MSS); Companion (CSS); Officer (OSS)

Statistics
- First induction: 26 September 1928
- Last induction: 1946
- Ribbon of the Order

The Most Excellent Order of the Star of Sarawak (Malay: Darjah Yang Amat Gemilang Bintang Sarawak) was established by Charles Vyner Brooke, The Rajah of Sarawak, on 26 September 1928 as the highest order of chivalry within the Raj of Sarawak. The motto of the Order was "Haraplah Sa-lagi Bernafas", the Sarawak state motto, a translation of the Latin phrase Dum Spiro Spero, which literally means "As long as I breathe, I hope".

When instituted, the Order held dual status as a dynastic order of knighthood as well as a state order, with the Rajah as its Sovereign. It had a bright yellow ribbon with a black line down the centre. When Sarawak became a British colony in 1946, the Rajah stopped making appointments, and in 2006 the Order became dormant upon the death of the last-known recipient, Elizabeth Choy.

In 1964, the post-independence government of Sarawak constituted The Most Illustrious Order of the Star of Sarawak (Darjah Yang Amat Mulia Bintang Sarawak), and in 1988, renamed it The Most Exalted Order of the Star of Sarawak (Darjah Utama Yang Amat Mulia Bintang Sarawak). This current Order has no connection whatsoever with the previous one except in name.

== Composition ==
The Order consisted of:

- Sovereign
- Grand Master

The three ordinary ranks of members are:

- Master (MSS)-consists of breast star, sash, and sash badge.
- Companion (CSS)-a badge worn from a necklet.
- Officer (OSS)-a badge worn from a medal ribbon on the left breast.

Rank	Appointed	Recipients Name	Notes
Sovereign	26-Jun-1929	Charles Vyner Brooke	
Grand Master	21-Sep-1941	Sylvia Brooke	
Master	31-Mar-1941	Datu Patinggi Abang Haji Abdillah (1862–1946)	A Malay leader in Kuching, and also in Sarawak, renowned for his non-violent struggle against the cession of Sarawak to Britain.
Master	31-Mar-1941	John Beville Archer, CMG	
Master	21-Sep-1941	Cyril Drummond Le Gros Clark	Chief Secretary of Sarawak
Companions	26-Sep-1928	Ong Tiang Swee, OBE (1864–1950)	A renowned Chinese leader in Kuching. His grandson, Late Tan Sri Datuk Amar Ong Kee Hui is a renowned politician.
Companions	31-Mar-1941	Abang Suleiman	
Companions	31-Mar-1941	Inche Haji Mohamed Zin	
Companions	31-Mar-1941	John Gordon Anderson	
Companions	31-Mar-1941	Thomas Corson	
Companions	31-Mar-1941	Cecil Pitt-Hardacre, OBE	
Companions	31-Mar-1941	Kenelm Hubert Digby	
Companions	21-Sep-1941	Leonora Margaret Brooke	Daughter of Rajah Charles Vyner Brooke
Companions	20-Jun-1946	Thomas Edward Eastick, DSO, ED	Military Governor of Sarawak from 10 September 1945 to December 1945
Companions	20-Jun-1946	Tan Bak Lim	
Companions	20-Jun-1946	Aloysius Hopfgartner	Former Principal of St. Joseph School Kuching (August 1931 – 1934)
Companions	27-Jun-1946	John Alfred Smith, OBE	
Companions	27-Jun-1946	Wee Kheng Chiang	Founder of United Overseas Bank (UOB)
Companions	22-Jul-1941	Gerald Trueman MacGill MacBryan	Private Secretary to Rajah Charles Vyner Brooke
Officers	31-Mar-1941	Barbara Pitt-Hardacre	
Officers	20-Jun-1946	Khan Ah Chong, MBE	
Officers	20-Jun-1946	Lau Chai Lim	
Officers	20-Jun-1946	Mangu Ah Kui	
Officers	20-Jun-1946	Charles Stephen Were	
Officers	20-Jun-1946	Thomas Crocker	
Officers	20-Jun-1946	Thomas Attenborough	
Officers	20-Jun-1946	William Geikie	
Officers	20-Jun-1946	Ethel Annie Henderson, MBE	Nursing Sister, Kuching General Hospital 1935–1942; interned by Japanese
Officers	20-Jun-1946	Murugasu Sockalingham	
Officers	20-Jun-1946	Dennis Charles White	
Officers	20-Jun-1946	John Coleraine Hanbury Barcroft	
Officers	20-Jun-1946	Kho Soon Ewe	
Officers	20-Jun-1946	Chin Shin Sen	
Officers	20-Jun-1946	George Edward Bacon	
Officers	27-Jun-1946	Helen Chan	
Officers	27-Jun-1946	Elizabeth Choy (1910–2006)	North Borneo-born Singaporean war heroine. Rajah Charles Vyner Brooke presented her with the Order in recognition of her work of assisting the British POWs during the Japanese occupation.
Officers	27-Jun-1946	Lim Song Kee	
Officers	27-Jun-1946	Edwin William Howell	
