= Ong Kee Hui =

Malaysian politician

Yang Berbahagia Tan Sri Datuk Amar Ong Kee Hui PMN PPM DA PNBS PGDK

Minister of Science, Technology and Environment
- In office 5 March 1976 – 16 July 1981
- Monarchs: Yahya Petra; Ahmad Shah
- Deputy: Clarence E. Mansul
- Preceded by: Mohamed Yaacob (as Minister of Energy, Technology and Research)
- Succeeded by: Stephen Yong Kuet Tze
- Constituency: Bandar Kuching

Minister of Local Government and Housing
- In office 9 February 1971 – 4 March 1976
- Monarchs: Abdul Halim; Yahya Petra
- Preceded by: Khaw Kai Boh
- Succeeded by: Michael Chen Wing Sum
- Constituency: Bandar Kuching

1st President of Sarawak United People's Party
- In office 1959–1982
- Preceded by: Office established
- Succeeded by: Stephen Yong Kuet Tze

Member of the Malaysian Parliament for Bandar Kuching
- In office 1971–1982
- Preceded by: Constituency established
- Succeeded by: Sim Keng Soon @ Sim Kuang Yang
- Majority: 12,126 (1969); 2,683 (1974); 14,813 (1978)

Personal details
- Born: 19 August 1914 Kuching, Kingdom of Sarawak, British Empire (now Sarawak, Malaysia)
- Died: 19 April 2000 (aged 85) Kuching, Sarawak, Malaysia
- Party: Sarawak United People's Party (SUPP)
- Other political affiliations: Alliance Party; Barisan Nasional (BN)
- Spouse: Wee Bee Siok (黃美惜)
- Parent(s): Ong Kwan Hin (father, deceased); Wee Geok Sim (mother, deceased)
- Occupation: Businessman; Politician

Tan Sri Datuk Amar Ong Kee Hui (Chinese: 王其輝; Pe̍h-ōe-jī: Ông Kî-hui; pinyin: Wáng Qíhuī; 19 August 1914 – 19 April 2000) was a Malaysian Chinese politician and founder cum first president of the Sarawak United People's Party which was founded on 12 June 1959. His family trace their origins to Baijiao Village in Longhai, China.

== Family History ==
Ong Kee Hui is the great-grandson of Ong Ewe Hai (1830-1888), a leading Sarawakian merchant and Rajah Charles Brooke's advisor on Chinese Affairs, and also confidant; grandson of Ong Tiang Swee (1864-1950), the first Chinese nominated to the Sarawak Council Negri (Legislative Council) in 1937; and son of Ong Kwan Hin (1896-1982), a recognised authority on Chinese temples, who was nominated to the Sarawak Council Negri (Legislative Council) as well.

Generations of the Ong family played a prominent role for the Hokkien community in Sarawak. His great-grandfather Ong Ewe Hai was a prominent Kapitan China to the Hokkien community of Sarawak, and a successful businessman in multiple fields. His grandfather, Ong Tiang Swee was Kapitan China, and also President of the Chinese Chamber of Commerce. His father, Ong Kwan Hin was also Kapitan China. Both Ong Tiang Swee and Ong Kwan Hin were the first two Chinese people nominated to the Sarawak Council Negri (Legislative Council) in 1937.

Ong Kee Hui is also related to Ong Poh Lim. His great grandfather Ong Koon Tian ( d:1837) was born in Bai Jiao, Fujian, China and left for south-east Asia to make his fortune, at which he was not successful - on his death he left three sons and three daughters impoverished.

== Early life ==
Born in 1914 in Kuching, he was educated at St. Thomas's School in Kuching and later St. Andrew's School in Singapore. He received his diploma in Agricultural Science from Serdang College (present-day Universiti Putra Malaysia).

== Career ==
In 1935, he entered the Sarawak Government civil service when he returned home to serve the Department of Agriculture. He believed in Sarawak's cession to Great Britain in 1946, which ended Brooke Sarawak and brought citizenship to Sarawak based on jus soli to the Chinese, who were regarded as immigrants.

Leaving government service in 1948, Ong entered business under the tutelage of Datuk Amar Wee Kheng Chiang, his father-in-law, who appointed him manager of the family's Bian Chiang Bank, today known as CIMB Group, devoting himself to business and banking.

=== Rise to politics ===
In the mid-1950s, Ong Kee Hui started his political career as a nominated member of the Council Negri (State Legislative Council), and he was elected to the Kuching Municipal Council as the Mayor of Kuching and an unofficial member of the Supreme Council (State Cabinet) as Minister of Technology, Research and Local Government.

The “divide and rule” method of the British encouraged the communal polarisation of Sarawak politics, something that he and his contemporaries viewed with alarm as boding ill for future Sarawak democracy. To counter this trend, Ong, together with Datuk Amar Stephen Yong Kuet Tze and colleagues, established the Sarawak United People's Party (SUPP) as Sarawak's first political party in 1959.

When Malaysia was proposed, Ong argued for Sarawak's independence, before joining the greater federation. The Sarawak United People's Party supported his stance for independence. Ong was also a member of the Malaysian Solidarity Convention's Sarawak delegation in 1962.

Malaysia became an independent country in 1963. In 1965, he seized the expulsion of Singapore to call for a referendum but was rejected.

After much encouragement and pragmatism from then Deputy Prime Minister, Tun Abdul Razak, he was convinced to forge political partnerships and consequently, Sarawak United People's Party joined the State Government in 1971. He served as the Minister of Local Government and Housing and Minister of Science Technology & Environment under Tun Abdul Razak's Cabinet. However, being a federal minister in Kuala Lumpur divorced him from Sarawakian grassroots politics.

In 1980, he stood down as party chairman of SUPP and retired to pen his memoirs, Footprints in Sarawak.

== Honours ==
He was bestowed the titles "Datuk" later upgraded to "Dato' Sri" (PNBS) and "Datuk Amar" (DA) by the Sarawak State Government, "Datuk" (PGDK) by the Sabah State Government and "Tan Sri" (PMN) by the Government of Malaysia.

The Malaysian Institute of Chemistry also awards the Tan Sri Datuk Ong Kee Hui Postgraduate Chemistry Award to candidates who produce an outstanding thesis.

In Kuching, there is a road named after him, called Jalan Tan Sri Ong Kee Hui. The headquarters of the Sarawak United People's Party sits here.

A road called Jalan Hui Sing, or better known as Hui Sing Garden in Kuching is also named after Ong Kee Hui and Ong Moh Sing in a joint venture development for a residential area.

Today, there are seven roads in Kuching, Sarawak named after generations of the Ong family, some by the Rajah in recognition of their contribution to the community. These include Jalan Ewe Hai (also Ewe Hai street), Jalan Ong Tiang Swee, Jalan Ong Kwan Hin, Jalan Ong Kee Hui, Jalan Hui Sing, Jalan Datin Wee (Ong) Siew Eng and Jalan Ong Hup Leong, a branch road of Jalan Ong Tiang Swee.

=== Honours of Malaysia ===
- Malaysia
  - Recipient of the Malaysian Commemorative Medal (Silver) (PPM) (1965)
  - Commander of the Order of the Defender of the Realm (PMN) – Tan Sri (1975)
- Sabah
  - Commander of the Order of Kinabalu (PGDK) – Datuk
- Sarawak
  - Knight Commander of the Order of the Star of Sarawak (PNBS) – Dato Sri
  - Knight Commander of the Order of the Star of Hornbill Sarawak (DA) – Datuk Amar

== Personal life ==
On 14 September 1937, he married Wee Bee Siok (Chinese: 黃美惜; Pe̍h-ōe-jī: Ûiⁿ Bí-sioh; pinyin: Huáng Měixī), the daughter of a successful banker and businessman, Datuk Wee Kheng Chiang, in a traditional Chinese ceremony. They have eight children - two sons and six daughters.
