= Bandar Kuching =

Federal constituency of Sarawak, Malaysia

Bandar Kuching (P195)
Sarawak constituency

Federal constituency
- Legislature: Dewan Rakyat
- MP: Kelvin Yii Lee Wuen; PH
- Constituency created: 1968
- First contested: 1969
- Last contested: 2022

Demographics
- Population (2020): 116,280
- Electors (2022): 109,710
- Area (km²): 35
- Pop. density (per km²): 3,322.3

Bandar Kuching is a federal constituency in Kuching Division (Kuching District), Sarawak, Malaysia, that has been represented in the Dewan Rakyat since 1971.

The federal constituency was created in the 1968 redistribution and is mandated to return a single member to the Dewan Rakyat under the first past the post voting system.

== Demographics ==
Ethnic breakdown of Bandar Kuching's electorate as of 2022
1. Chinese (91.7%)
2. Sarawak bumiputera (5.00%)
3. Malay-Muslim bumiputera (2.40%)
4. Other ethnicities (0.90%)

As of 2020, Bandar Kuching has a population of 116,280 people.

Age breakdown of Bandar Kuching's electorate as of 2022
1. 18-20 (3.51%)
2. 21-29 (12.6%)
3. 30-39 (16.0%)
4. 40-49 (17.1%)
5. 50-59 (18.1%)
6. 60-69 (18.0%)
7. 70-79 (10.2%)
8. 80-89 (3.61%)
9. above 90 (0.93%)
Gender breakdown of Bandar Kuching's electorate as of 2022
1. Male (48.6%)
2. Female (51.4%)

== History ==
=== Polling districts ===
According to the gazette issued on 31 October 2022, the Bandar Kuching constituency has a total of 31 polling districts.

State constituency	Polling Districts	Code	Location
Padungan (N09)	Market	195/09/01	SMK St. Thomas Kuching
Padungan (N09)	Bazaar	195/09/02	SK St. Mary Kuching
Padungan (N09)	Padungan	195/09/03	SMK Tinggi Kuching
Padungan (N09)	Abell	195/09/04	SJK (C) Song Keng Hai (Blok A)
Padungan (N09)	Deshon	195/09/05	SJK (C) Chung Hua No.3 (Kanan)
Padungan (N09)	Sekama	195/09/06	SK Lumba Kuda Kuching (Blok A)
Padungan (N09)	Bukit Tuan	195/09/07	SK Batu Lintang Kuching
Padungan (N09)	Kinyang	195/09/08	SK Catholic English Kuching
Padungan (N09)	Ellis	195/09/09	SMK Padungan (Blok A)
Padungan (N09)	Ban Hock	195/05/10	SJK (C) Song Kueng Hai (Blok B)
Padungan (N09)	Lumba Kuda	195/09/11	SMK Padungan (Blok B)
Padungan (N09)	Central	195/09/12	SJK (C) Chung Hua 3 (Kiri)
Padungan (N09)	Petanak	195/09/13	SK Lumba Kuda Kuching (Block B)
Pending (N10)	Pending	195/10/01	SJK (C) Chung Hua Pending; SMK Pending; SJK (C) Bintawa
Pending (N10)	Foochow	195/10/02	SM Chung Hua No.1; SM Chung Hua No.3; SK Tabuan Ulu
Pending (N10)	Kenyalang	195/10/03	SK Kenyalang
Pending (N10)	Supreme	195/10/04	SMK Bandar Kuching No.1 (Blok A)
Pending (N10)	Chong Kiun Kong	195/11/05	Dewan Masyarakat (KPCA)
Pending (N10)	Chawan	195/10/06	SJK (C) Chung Hua No.5
Pending (N10)	Simpang Tiga	195/10/07	SMK Bandar Kuching No.1 (Blok B)
Batu Lintang (N11)	Pisang	195/11/01	SJK (C) St. Paul
Batu Lintang (N11)	Batu Lintang	195/11/02	SMK Batu Lintang; SK Jln Ong Tiang Swee; St. John Ambulance Headquarters Building Lorong Cheng Ho No.8
Batu Lintang (N11)	Star Garden	195/11/03	SMK Green Road
Batu Lintang (N11)	Poh Kwong Park	195/11/04	SK Combined (Blok A)
Batu Lintang (N11)	Sky Green	195/11/05	SK Green Road
Batu Lintang (N11)	Bukit Kenny	195/11/06	Blik Perbincangan, Islamic Information Centre
Batu Lintang (N11)	Tabuan Dayak	195/11/07	Lobi Blessed Church, Jln Seladah Off Jalan Tun Jugah
Batu Lintang (N11)	Tabuan Jaya	195/11/08	Lodge International School; SMK Lodge
Batu Lintang (N11)	Tabuan Laru	195/11/09	SMK Tabuan Jaya
Batu Lintang (N11)	Maong	195/11/10	SK Sg. Maong Hilir
Batu Lintang (N11)	Nanas-Pisang	195/11/11	SK Combined (Block B)

=== Representation history ===
Members of Parliament for Bandar Kuching
Parliament	No	Years	Member	Party	Vote Share
Constituency created
		1969-1971	Parliament was suspended		
3rd	P122	1971-1973	Ong Kee Hui (王其辉)	SUPP	13,410; 85.60%
3rd	P122	1973-1974	Ong Kee Hui (王其辉)	BN (SUPP)	13,410; 85.60%
4th	P132	1974-1978	Ong Kee Hui (王其辉)	BN (SUPP)	11,534; 55.34%
5th	P132	1978-1982	Ong Kee Hui (王其辉)	BN (SUPP)	19,902; 79.64%
6th	P132	1982-1986	Sim Kuang Yang (沈观仰)	DAP	19,200; 55.14%
7th	P155	1986-1990	Sim Kuang Yang (沈观仰)	DAP	26,468; 58.87%
8th	P157	1990-1995	Sim Kuang Yang (沈观仰)	GR (DAP)	25,573; 56.85%
9th	P169	1995-1999	Song Swee Guan (宋瑞源)	BN (SUPP)	27,514; 53.07%
10th	P169	1999-2004	Song Swee Guan (宋瑞源)	BN (SUPP)	18,239; 53.64%
11th	P195	2004-2008	Chong Chieng Jen (张健仁)	DAP	17,914; 53.02%
12th	P195	2008-2013	Chong Chieng Jen (张健仁)	PR (DAP)	22,901; 63.88%
13th	P195	2013-2018	Chong Chieng Jen (张健仁)	PR (DAP)	30,133; 74.18%
14th	P195	2018-2022	Kelvin Yii Lee Wuen (俞利文)	PH (DAP)	48,548; 79.43%
15th	P195	2022–present	Kelvin Yii Lee Wuen (俞利文)	PH (DAP)	45,353; 71.34%

=== State constituency ===
Parliamentary constituency	State constituency					
Parliamentary constituency	1969–1978	1978–1990	1990–1999	1999–2008	2008–2016	2016−present
Bandar Kuching			Batu Lintang			Batu Lintang
Bandar Kuching	Kuching Barat					
Bandar Kuching	Kuching Timor					
Bandar Kuching		Padungan				
Bandar Kuching			Pending			
Bandar Kuching		Stampin				

=== Historical boundaries ===
State Constituency	Area					
State Constituency	1968	1977	1987	1996	2005	2015
Batu Lintang			Batu Lintang; Jalan Batu Kawa; Sama Jaya; Stapok; Stutong			Batu Lintang; Jalan Song; Tabuan Jaya; Taman Poh Kong; Stapok
Kuching Barat	Satok; Tupong; Kampung Bandarshah; Kampung Kudei; Kampung Masjid					
Kuching Timor	Batu Lintang; Bintawa; Kenyalang; Padungan; Pending					
Padungan		Batu Lintang; Bintawa; Kenyalang; Padungan; Pending	Jalan Abell; Jalan Ban Hock; Jalan Central Timur; Jalan Ellis; Padungan	Kampung Boyan; Padungan; Petanak; Sekama; Taman Budaya	Bukit Tuan; Kuching; Padungan; Petanak; Sekama	
Pending			Bintawa; Jalan Wan Alwi; Kenyalang; Pending; Simpang Tiga			
Stampin		Stapok; Stutong; Sungai Maong; Tabuan Jaya; Taman Hui Sing				

=== Current state assembly members ===
No.	State Constituency	Member	Coalition (Party)
N09	Padungan	Chong Chieng Jen	PH (DAP)
N10	Pending	Violet Yong Wui Wui	PH (DAP)
N11	Batu Lintang	See Chee How	IND

=== Local governments & postcodes ===
No.	State Constituency	Local Government	Postcode
N09	Padungan	Kuching North City Hall (Bazar and Bukit Tuan areas); Kuching South City Council	90000, 93100, 93150. 93200, 93300, 93350, 93400, 93450, 93500 Kuching
N10	Pending	Kuching South City Council	90000, 93100, 93150. 93200, 93300, 93350, 93400, 93450, 93500 Kuching
N11	Batu Lintang	Kuching North City Hall; Kuching South City Council (Batu Lintang and Tabuan Jaya areas)	90000, 93100, 93150. 93200, 93300, 93350, 93400, 93450, 93500 Kuching

== Election results ==
Malaysian general election, 2022: Bandar Kuching
Party	Candidate	Votes	%	∆%
DAP	Kelvin Yii Lee Wuen	45,353	71.34	▼8.09
GPS	Tay Tze Kok	16,462	25.89	▲25.89
PSB	Voon Lee Shan	1,760	2.77	▲2.77
Total valid votes		63,575	100.00	
Total rejected ballots		301		
Unreturned ballots		192		
Turnout		64,068	57.95	▼17.16
Registered electors		109,710		
Majority		28,891	45.45	▼54.31
DAP hold		Swing		
Source(s) https://lom.agc.gov.my/ilims/upload/portal/akta/outputp/1753265/PARLIMEN%20SARAWAK%20(PUB%20620).pdf

Malaysian general election, 2018: Bandar Kuching
Party	Candidate	Votes	%	∆%
DAP	Kelvin Yii Lee Wuen	48,548	79.43	▲5.25
BN	Kho Teck Wan	12,575	20.57	▼5.25
Total valid votes		61,123	100.00	
Total rejected ballots		241		
Unreturned ballots		119		
Turnout		61,483	75.11	▼1.53
Registered electors		81,856		
Majority		35,973	58.85	▲10.49
DAP hold		Swing		
Source(s) "His Majesty's Government Gazette - Notice of Contested Election, Parliament for the State of Sarawak [P.U. (B) 247/2018]" (PDF). Attorney General's Chambers of Malaysia. 3 May 2018. "Federal Government Gazette - Results of Contested Election and Statements of the Poll after the Official Addition of Votes, Parliamentary Constituencies for the State of Sarawak [P.U. (B) 321/2018]" (PDF). Attorney General's Chambers of Malaysia. 28 May 2018. Archived from the original (PDF) on 29 December 2019.

Malaysian general election, 2013: Bandar Kuching
Party	Candidate	Votes	%	∆%
DAP	Chong Chieng Jen	30,133	74.18	▲10.30
BN	Tan Kai	10,491	25.82	▼10.30
Total valid votes		40,624	100.00	
Total rejected ballots		201		
Unreturned ballots		54		
Turnout		40,879	76.64	▲8.51
Registered electors		53,336		
Majority		19,642	48.36	▲20.60
DAP hold		Swing		
Source(s) "Federal Government Gazette - Notice of Contested Election, Parliament for the State of Sarawak [P.U. (B) 184/2013]" (PDF). Attorney General's Chambers of Malaysia. 26 April 2013. Archived from the original (PDF) on 30 September 2018. "Federal Government Gazette - Results of Contested Election and Statements of the Poll after the Official Addition of Votes, Parliamentary Constituencies for the State of Sarawak [P.U. (B) 225/2013]" (PDF). Attorney General's Chambers of Malaysia. 22 May 2013. Archived from the original (PDF) on 30 September 2018.

Malaysian general election, 2008: Bandar Kuching
Party	Candidate	Votes	%	∆%
DAP	Chong Chieng Jen	22,901	63.88	▲10.86
BN	Sim Yaw Yen	12,949	36.12	▼10.86
Total valid votes		35,850	100.00	
Total rejected ballots		242		
Unreturned ballots		165		
Turnout		36,257	68.13	▲5.07
Registered electors		53,216		
Majority		9,952	27.76	▲21.72
DAP hold		Swing		

Malaysian general election, 2004: Bandar Kuching
Party	Candidate	Votes	%	∆%
DAP	Chong Chieng Jen	17,914	53.02	▲35.63
BN	Wee Kok Tiong	15,873	46.98	▼6.66
Total valid votes		33,787	100.00	
Total rejected ballots		577		
Unreturned ballots		329		
Turnout		34,693	63.06	▼1.62
Registered electors		55,012		
Majority		2,041	6.04	▼18.63
DAP gain from BN		Swing		?

Malaysian general election, 1999: Bandar Kuching
Party	Candidate	Votes	%	∆%
BN	Song Swee Guan	18,239	53.64	▲0.57
Independent	Dominique Ng Kim Ho	9,850	28.97	▲28.97
DAP	Chong Chieng Jen	5,913	17.39	▼29.54
Total valid votes		34,002	100.00	
Total rejected ballots		238		
Unreturned ballots		1,078		
Turnout		35,318	64.68	▼5.30
Registered electors		54,598		
Majority		8,389	24.67	▲18.53
BN hold		Swing		

Malaysian general election, 1995: Bandar Kuching
Party	Candidate	Votes	%	∆%
BN	Song Swee Guan	27,514	53.07	▲9.92
DAP	Sim Keng Soon @ Sim Kuang Yang	24,330	46.93	▼9.92
Total valid votes		51,844	100.00	
Total rejected ballots		379		
Unreturned ballots		277		
Turnout		52,500	70.04	▼0.41
Registered electors		74,592		
Majority		3,184	6.14	▼7.56
BN gain from DAP		Swing		?

Malaysian general election, 1990: Bandar Kuching
Party	Candidate	Votes	%	∆%
DAP	Sim Keng Soon @ Sim Kuang Yang	25,573	56.85	▼2.02
BN	Stephen Yong Kuet Tze	19,409	43.15	▲2.02
Total valid votes		44,982	100.00	
Total rejected ballots		295		
Unreturned ballots		0		
Turnout		45,277	70.45	▼2.36
Registered electors		64,262		
Majority		6,164	13.70	▼4.04
DAP hold		Swing		

Malaysian general election, 1986: Bandar Kuching
Party	Candidate	Votes	%	∆%
DAP	Sim Keng Soon @ Sim Kuang Yang	26,468	58.87	▲3.73
BN	Chan Seng Kai	18,494	41.13	▼3.73
Total valid votes		44,962	100.00	
Total rejected ballots		582		
Unreturned ballots		0		
Turnout		45,544	72.81	▼1.83
Registered electors		62,550		
Majority		7,974	17.74	▲7.46
DAP hold		Swing		

Malaysian general election, 1982: Bandar Kuching
Party	Candidate	Votes	%	∆%
DAP	Sim Keng Soon @ Sim Kuang Yang	19,200	55.14	▲55.14
BN	Loke Yik Ping	15,623	44.86	▲44.86
Total valid votes		34,823	100.00	
Total rejected ballots		431		
Unreturned ballots		0		
Turnout		35,254	74.69	▲4.19
Registered electors		47,201		
Majority		3,577	10.28	▼49.00
DAP gain from BN		Swing		?

Malaysian general election, 1978: Bandar Kuching
Party	Candidate	Votes	%	∆%
BN	Ong Kee Hui	19,902	79.64	▲24.30
Independent	Leong Ho Yuen	5,089	20.36	▲20.36
Total valid votes		24,991	100.00	
Total rejected ballots		759		
Unreturned ballots		0		
Turnout		25,750	70.50	▼5.74
Registered electors		36,527		
Majority		14,813	59.28	▲46.41
BN hold		Swing		

Malaysian general election, 1974: Bandar Kuching
Party	Candidate	Votes	%	∆%
BN	Ong Kee Hui	11,534	55.34	▼30.26
SNAP	Leong Ho Yuen	8,851	42.47	▲42.47
Independent	Peter Ng Eng Lim	457	2.19	▲2.19
Total valid votes		20,842	100.00	
Total rejected ballots		638		
Unreturned ballots		0		
Turnout		21,480	76.24	▼7.28
Registered electors		28,175		
Majority		2,683	12.87	▼64.53
BN gain from SUPP		Swing		?

Malaysian general election, 1969: Bandar Kuching
Party	Candidate	Votes	%
SUPP	Ong Kee Hui	13,410	85.60
Independent	Kenneth Lau Ah Lah	1,284	8.20
Independent	Ong Khai Yan	972	6.20
Total valid votes		15,666	100.00
Total rejected ballots		5,113	
Unreturned ballots			
Turnout		20,779	83.53
Registered electors		24,877	
Majority		12,126	77.40
This was a new constituency created.
