= Gerard MacBryan =

British private secretary to the Rajah of Sarawak

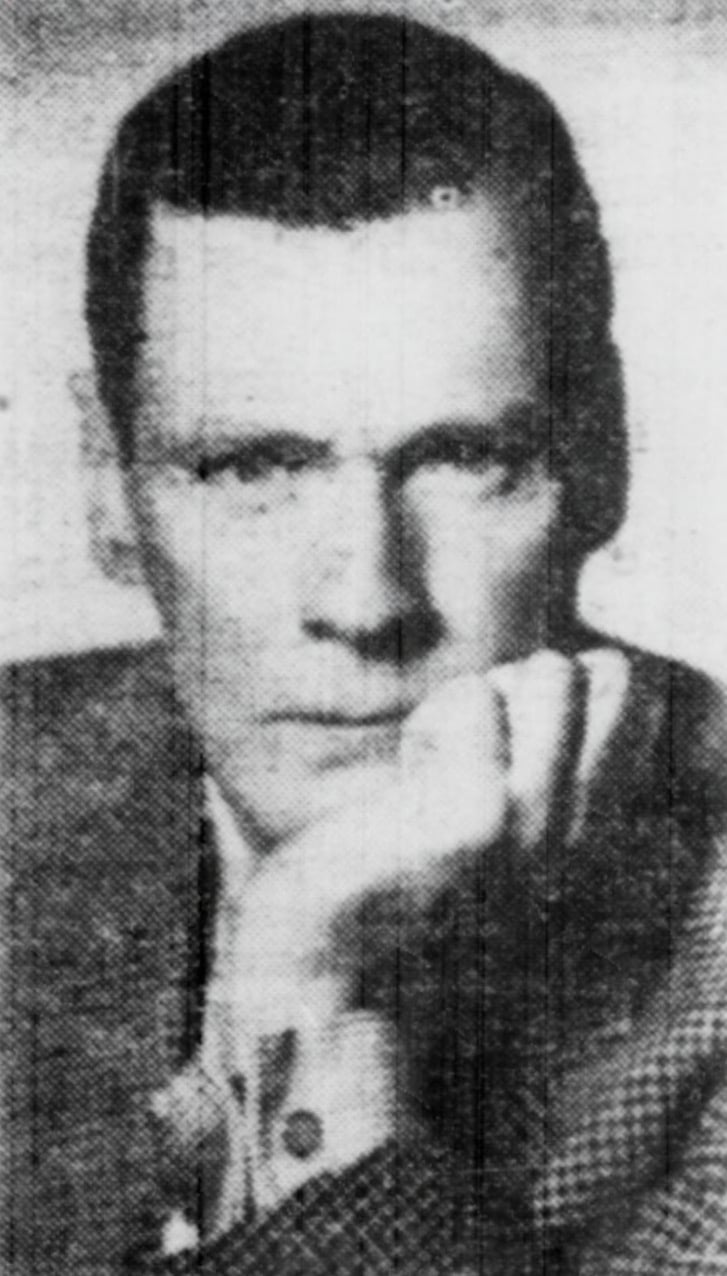
- MacBryan, c. 1950
- Born: Gerard Truman Magill MacBryan; 9 January 1902; Box, Wiltshire, England, United Kingdom
- Died: 1953 (aged 50–51); British Hong Kong
- Known for: Private secretary to Rajah Charles Vyner Brooke and political advisor to Sultan Ahmad Tajuddin

Gerard Truman Magill MacBryan (9 January 1902 – 1953) who initially served as Rajah Charles Vyner Brooke's Private Secretary and curator at the Sarawak Museum, was notable for his involvement in the annexation of Raj of Sarawak by the British Crown and later meddled in Brunei's affairs, gaining the trust of Sultan Ahmad Tajuddin through connections made in Kuching. In her book Queen of the Headhunters, Sylvia Brett, the last Ranee of Sarawak, introduces MacBryan as "a young man who was destined to play a sinister part in the history of the Sarawak Raj."

After the Sultan's death on 4 June 1950, the succession to the Bruneian throne was seamlessly managed with British support for his brother Omar Ali Saifuddien III, but MacBryan, claiming to have been appointed political adviser by the late Sultan, attempted to assert himself in Brunei's affairs, only to be thwarted by British intervention. In mid-1950, MacBryan, posing as Ahmad Tajuddin's envoy, tried to negotiate with Standard Oil and alert the United States about perceived injustices in Brunei's treaties with Britain, while also claiming the Sultan's daughter had a right to the throne similar to British monarchs, but his claims were exposed as fraudulent by British officials led by Malcolm MacDonald, who then supported Omar Ali Saifuddien III to maintain good relations with Britain.

== Early life ==
Born on 9 January 1902, in Wiltshire, Gerard Truman Magill MacBryan was the youngest of Eveline Ada Truman and Dr. Henry Crawford MacBryan's five sons. His father was an Irish physician who ran the first private mental health facility in England, located at Box, close to Bath. In the meantime, his mother died the moment he was born. He went to school at Burnham-on-Sea, where he was once charged with theft. Later, he enrolled at a naval training college, but he pretended to be colour-blind in order to pass his military entrance exams. His father's friend Henry Deshon encouraged him to apply for a cadetship in the Sarawak Service.

== Sarawak ==
=== Service to the White Rajahs ===
MacBryan joined the Straits Civil Service's Sarawak administration in 1920 when he was eighteen years old, but word soon got around about his unstable nature. Robert Payne and Sylvia Brett both kept notes on his strange behaviour; Sylvia related how he would have wild shooting sprees into the night because he would have hallucinations of attacks on his bungalow. The "madman" Payne referred to was MacBryan, who reportedly had manic episodes, including appearing naked at a party believing he was invisible, acting like a dog, and stealing from shops and alms-boxes.

MacBryan spent the first decade of his career in Sarawak, serving as Rajah Charles Vyner Brooke's Private Secretary in the late 1920s. His first posting as a government cadet in Limbang in 1920 introduced him to the Bruneian Sultanate, where he built strong connections and gained insights into the Sultanate's inner workings. His fluency in Malay, (Note: Under the guidance of his tutor, Native Officer Abang Hj. Moasili, MacBryan quickly became fluent in Malay and became acquainted with the nuances of jawi writing.) including the noble court dialect, helped him navigate Brunei's aristocratic circles and understand the challenges of the declining Sultanate. He suffered from manic episodes, but he stayed in Sarawak because of his strong friendship with Brooke, who called him "wonderful, but nuts." Speaking Malay fluently and being well-liked by both Dayak and Malay people, he assisted in the negotiation of a peace treaty between the Kayans and Ibans in 1924. Realising his brilliance and aptitude, Brooke gave him the moniker "Baron" in honour of the eccentric Baron von Munchausen. According to historian Bob Reece, he was an accomplished politician who had an understanding of the Rajah's thinking. As such, Brooke found him to be beneficial in making judgments on his behalf.

In June of the following year, he went to witness the formal investiture of Sultan Muhammad Jamalul Alam II with the K.C.M.G. by Sir Laurence Guillemard, the Governor of the Straits Settlements at the time, along with F. F. Boult, the Resident of the Fifth Division. In order to finance the education of Sarawak's European officers' offspring, he convinced Brooke to establish the Rajah of Sarawak Fund in 1930 while he was in London for a Colonial Office Conference. His scheme was foiled, nevertheless, by the Colonial Office, which prepared a deed limiting benefits to children of pure European blood in all Colonial Services, not just the Sarawak Service.

However, MacBryan was later banned from the region for nearly ten years due to various misdemeanours. He attempted to return to Sarawak in 1935 when he married a Kuching Malay woman, Sa'erah binte Abdul Kadir, in Singapore using Islamic customs. He declared that he had made the hajj to Mecca, returning with the name Haji Abdul Rahman (Note: Abdur Rahman is another spelling of his name.) and wearing white Arabian robes that King Ibn Saud had supposedly given him. But the native datu fiercely objected to his being in Sarawak, so he and his wife had to depart for London. There, he gained experience as a stockbroker and went on to oversee his father's exclusive mental health facility close to Bath.

After persuading Brooke to grant him permission to return to Kuching in August 1940, MacBryan worked briefly at the Sarawak Museum before being reappointed as Private Secretary in January 1941. This job was a part of the compensation he received for helping to arrange a covert financial agreement between the Committee of Administration and the Rajah, which opened the door for Sarawak's written constitution to be adopted in March 1941. Additionally, he was instrumental in mediating the Sultan Ahmad Tajuddin's and his Pengiran's compensation claims for the loss of their rights in the Limbang area. Aware of the significance Arabs had in Borneo, he donned his Arabian robes and headgear on a visit to Brunei in February 1941.

=== Negotiations and cession of Sarawak ===
Regarding Sarawak's authority over Limbang, MacBryan successfully negotiated settlements with the Sultan and a delegate of Limbang in February 1941. Subject to permission, the Sultan consented to collect $20,000 from Straits for previous sovereign rights and $1,000 each year for future rights. Pengiran Sabtu Kamaludin received a total of Straits $60,000 in exchange for the Limbang pengiran's surrender of taxation rights, plus a further $6,000 a year for future rights. There were also presents and pensions given out. The Sultan continued to receive a lower yearly sum even after the British Colonial Office terminated these payments, and MacBryan's influence in Brunei persisted even after it was discovered that a counterfeit deed had been discovered.

MacBryan worked with Australian Naval Intelligence during his wartime exile in Australia, suggesting a scheme to transport Indonesian and Malay students back to their homelands via submarine in order to obtain intelligence on the Japanese. But his British security background hindered him, and he was unable to get a job with General Douglas MacArthur. After the Rajah and MacBryan returned to Britain in 1943, he was instrumental in the final discussions with the Colonial Office that resulted in the Rajah's decision to hand over Sarawak's sovereignty to Britain in 1945. MacBryan, despite his dubious past and a British Military Intelligence dossier on him, was assigned the responsibility of obtaining the consent of Sarawak's Chinese and Malay authorities for the handover.

The most notable contribution to the history of Sarawak was made by MacBryan when Brooke sent him to negotiate Sarawak's handover to the British administration. After World War II, according to local historian Ho Ah Chon, he was assigned as Brooke's private secretary to convince prominent Datu in Kuching to sign letters endorsing whatever move Brooke saw appropriate "in the interest of Sarawak," even though the letters made no mention of cession. Unexpectedly arriving in Kuching in January 1946, MacBryan carried official documentation to validate Sarawak's cession to Britain through hastily scheduled meetings of the Supreme Council and Council Negri. Additionally, he gave out freshly produced banknotes, purportedly to make up for the datu's lost wages during the Japanese occupation, but in actuality to win their support for the Rajah's scheme. The Rajah's brother Bertram Brooke revealed this devious plan, and the Colonial Office was compelled to act in accordance with the constitution. This led to a tight vote in favour of cession on 15 May 1946, and the official annexation of Sarawak and the creation of the Crown Colony of Sarawak on July 1. The community leaders signed without understanding the full ramifications, only to discover afterwards that they had been duped. Enraged by the deceit, Datu Patinggi Abdillah gave back the $12,000 that had been offered as a bribe.

Sylvia claims that the cession might not have happened in July 1946 if MacBryan hadn't used force. Historian Bob Reece, however, cast doubt on this assertion, stating that while MacBryan distorted the views of Brooke's brothers, Bertram and Anthony, it is impossible to confirm if he employed coercion or deception. History textbooks for secondary schools in Malaysia continue to include MacBryan's use of deceit to obtain signatures that allowed Sarawak to be ceded to Britain as a crown colony on 1 July 1946, even in light of the controversy surrounding it.

== Brunei ==
=== Mental struggles and influence in post-war Borneo ===
While in London in 1946 and early 1947, MacBryan suffered from serious mental health problems, including illusions of invisibility, which resulted in his theft arrest. He kept checking himself into psychiatric facilities in spite of his worsening health. He continued to counsel the Colonial Office about Borneo's future during this period, advocating that Brunei and Sarawak be united and that he might convince the Sultan to hand up Brunei to the Crown. He spent the next year in London, however there was some worry that he would go to Brunei to pursue this. After living in Johannesburg with his third wife, Frances, MacBryan returned to Sarawak on 30 April 1950, with the intention of reviving the Sarawak State Trust Fund for education. Initially, he had attempted to create the fund using the £1,000,000 of state monies that remained in Sarawak. The Colonial Office acknowledged this in March 1946, but in September 1949 it declared that the fund could not be created because it lacked a legal foundation. (Note: An arrangement crafted by MacBryan on 5 January 1946, was annulled by a vote of Sarawak's Council Negri in May 1946 and replaced with the Rajah's Dependants Order, which gave yearly life payments to the Rajah's family as well as other individuals, including MacBryan.)

In discussions with prominent authorities like as Arthur Grattan-Bellew, Sarawak's Attorney-General, MacBryan defended his case vehemently, but they stuck to the Colonial Office's line. As asked in the Rajah's proclamation of 14 January 1946, they declined to provide the £1,000,000 from Sarawak's reserve monies to establish the Trust Fund. This rejection, which put an end to his plan he floated as a help for the youth of Sarawak, was a major blow and made his pre-existing mental health problems worse, which had previously resulted in hospital stays in Johannesburg.

During his stay in Kuching in May 1950, MacBryan earned the trust of Sultan Ahmad Tajuddin, leveraging a prior friendship facilitated through the Sultan's private secretary, Inche Hassan bin Kulap Mohamed. MacBryan successfully convinced the Sultan to appoint him as Political Advisor for issues outside Brunei and to assist in advocating for constitutional and financial rights in London. This appointment was sanctioned by Britain's Special High Commissioner, Malcolm MacDonald, as it adhered to the provisions of Brunei's 1905–1906 Supplementary Treaty with Britain. He summarised the Sultan's stance in his opinion as follows:

The Sultan in his heart is deeply dissatisfied, and exemplifies Asiatic opinion generally. He is not by any means such a fool as he may seem to some. His weakness arises out of his sense of utter frustration. I have repeatedly warned the Colonial Office ... about the dangers of the Brunei Treaty to the whole British Commonwealth system in the East. The British Government would do well to realise that my warning was serious.

— MacBryan to Evelyn Hussey, 10 May 1950, Brooke Papers, Rhodes House Library Oxford, MSS Pac. s. 83.

=== Struggle with British policy ===
By 1 June 1950, MacBryan and the Sultan were lodging at Singapore's Raffles Hotel, getting ready to travel to London and meet with the Secretary of State for the Colonies to talk about Brunei's constitutional relationship with the United Kingdom. In letters that were probably written by MacBryan, the Sultan formally named him as his Political Secretary and declared Princess Nor Ehsani to be his heir and successor, to be known as Puteri Besar. Furthermore, albeit not in the capacity of Heir Apparent, Omar Ali Saifuddien, the younger brother of the Sultan, was already holding the highest post beneath the Sultan, that of Pengiran Bendahara. A third letter, signed by the Sultan, argued that Brooke could not have legally ceded Sarawak without consulting him. The Sultan also sought $5,000 in tribute from Straits, and MacBryan was given permission to take the matter up with the Secretary of State for the Colonies. The Sultan also expressed disapproval of Brunei's oilfield exploitation in a fourth letter, granting MacBryan authority to bring up this issue with the Secretary of State.

During his contentious career in Sarawak, MacBryan collaborated with Ranee Sylvia Brooke to change the male succession customs to benefit her daughter Leonora. He also persuaded the State Council to endorse this scheme by designating non-elite life datu. It seems that his goal was to wed one of the Brooke family's daughters, but he was unsuccessful in this quest. Sultan Ahmad Tajuddin's 1937 achievement in changing Brunei's succession to benefit his daughter may have served as MacBryan's inspiration.

Even after receiving a pay rise and more oil royalties, the Sultan was still not happy with the British government for not restoring Istana Mahkota, his primary residence, which was severely damaged by Allied bombing in early 1945. Taking advantage of the Sultan's gullibility and unhappiness, MacBryan convinced him to engage in political activities. One such activity was a scheduled trip to London, where Brunei's constitutional position would be renegotiated and British Malayan Petroleum would be pressured to pay greater royalties. In a concluding letter dated 1 June, which was addressed to MacBryan and was likely prepared by him again via typing, the Sultan made reference to the four earlier letters, informing him:

I have been very ill for a long time and the cause of it has been mental anguish at the way the oilfields of Brunei have been conceded without consideration of myself or my feelings or of the interests of my people. But I have been helpless because of the Treaties ... which have forced me to do whatever I was told in all matters ... My sole desire is that from a financial point of view a reasonable resource should be available to me to relieve the distress and suffering of my own people in the particular way I think right and not in the way that the British Residents and High Commissioners and Agents think right.

— Ahmad Tajuddin to MacBryan, 1 June 1950, Rhodes House, Oxford, MSS Pac. s. 83, Vol. 29, Box 4/4.

The Sultan gave MacBryan permission to serve as his personal and political agent in the United States in order to negotiate with Standard Oil for the complete development of Brunei's oilfields in the event that the British government continued its "unreasonable attitude." It seems unlikely that he had contacted Standard Oil by the middle of 1950, even though he had been investigating this relationship since 1941. The Sultan also gave him instructions to bring Brunei's complaints against Britain before the United Nations and to declare that his daughter was entitled to the same rights as the King of England's daughter in the event of her succession. MacBryan later made this information public in The Straits Times.

It is difficult to gauge the degree of MacBryan's influence over the Sultan at this time. Official notaries certified the four letters dated 1 June 1950, written by him on his portable typewriter and written in a more advanced form of English than the Sultan's. However, the originals, which were supposed to have the Sultan's yellow seal, are nowhere to be found. Although he could have falsified these records, it's also plausible that the Sultan, who was focused on post-war matters and had a tense relationship with British officials, had legitimate concerns expressed in the letters. The contents of the letters, in spite of forgery allegations, match the Sultan's known problems and interests.

In a short amount of time, MacBryan understood the Sultan's worries and effectively expressed them in a way that won the Sultan over. Like he had done with Brooke before, his aim was to become an indispensable member of the Sultan's court by using his proficiency in courtly Malay and his knowledge of the British Resident system. Apart from overseeing the Sultan's finances, he had aspirations of bringing Muslims in northern Borneo and the southern Philippines together under the newly reinstated government of Brunei. This proposal, which was likely concerning to Colonial Office officials already leery of the Sultan's direct talks with the Secretary of State, entailed breaking treaties that restricted Brunei's sovereignty and aiming for a greater portion of the Sultanate's oil production.

=== Role in the Bruneian succession crisis ===
Following the death of Sultan Ahmad Tajuddin, who had no male heir apparent, MacBryan attempted to usurp Omar Ali Saifuddien's succession and install sixteen-year-old Princess Nor Ehsani as the next monarch, in contravention of the 1937 arrangement with his wazir (vizier) and the 1 June 1950 titah (speech of the Sultan). The late Sultan's intentions were supported by members of the Selangor royal family and groups loyal to him, complicating MacBryan's efforts, as he recounted in a letter to MacDonald on 6 June. Tengku Kelana Jaya Petra was one of the leading opponents. She supported Princess Nor Ehsani and took a strong anti-British sentiment, which served as a focal point for resistance that was later documented in critical essays in the Singapore periodical Melayu Raya.

The day after the funeral and Omar Ali Saifuddien's proclamation as Sultan, MacBryan cabled King George VI from Singapore, protesting that Governor Anthony Abell had approved the wrong successor, asserting that the rightful heir was Princess Nor Ehsani. It's possible that MacBryan's goal was to wed Tuanku Ehsan in order to carry out his ambitious plan, akin to that of T. E. Lawrence, to unite all the Muslims in Borneo and the southern Philippines under the banner of a resurrected and reinforced Bruneian Sultanate. Most importantly, he had taken his headgear and Arabian robes with him once more.

At a news conference in Singapore on 7 June, MacBryan asserted that Omar Ali Saifuddien's intended coronation would be null and void in the absence of the royal regalia, which he claimed to be in possession of and which included a golden cane shaped like a serpent and dubbed the tongkat ular. The tongkat ular, according to Australian journalist Denis Warner, was only a rattan staff with a golden serpent's head on top. Citing a certificate designating him as the princess' guardian, he charged that the British government was denying her the kingdom. His allegations gained significant attention, as evidenced by images of him wearing the regalia and claims that he was the only one who knew of its customary use.

MacBryan met with MacDonald on the same day as the unrest around the succession. MacDonald wanted to keep him under control because he was concerned about his stirring up trouble in the newspapers. In support of his claim that the recent coronation was unlawful, he referenced Ahmad Tajuddin's 1 June titah, which recognised the princess as the legitimate successor. MacBryan was able to conceal the purported royal regalia in a local bank, eluding investigations by British Intelligence, even though MacDonald tried to recover it. Although MacDonald rejected MacBryan's accusations as careless and a sign of mental instability, the regalia controversy raised questions about the validity of Sultan Omar Ali Saifuddien III's coronation.

Arriving in Brunei on 11 June, MacBryan did not make contact with the Resident or local authorities while claiming to be in charge of the late Sultan's affairs. The letters he used to defend his conduct were seen by Grattan-Bellew, who thought his justifications were illogical. His wild ways, which included binge drinking and acting strangely, walking about in his undies and defying societal mores, for example, led to his official designation as "of unsound mind" by 17 June. He was sent to Singapore for medical attention, but on the way there he destroyed the navigational equipment of the M.V. Tenggiri, which led to more mayhem.

== Health decline and death ==
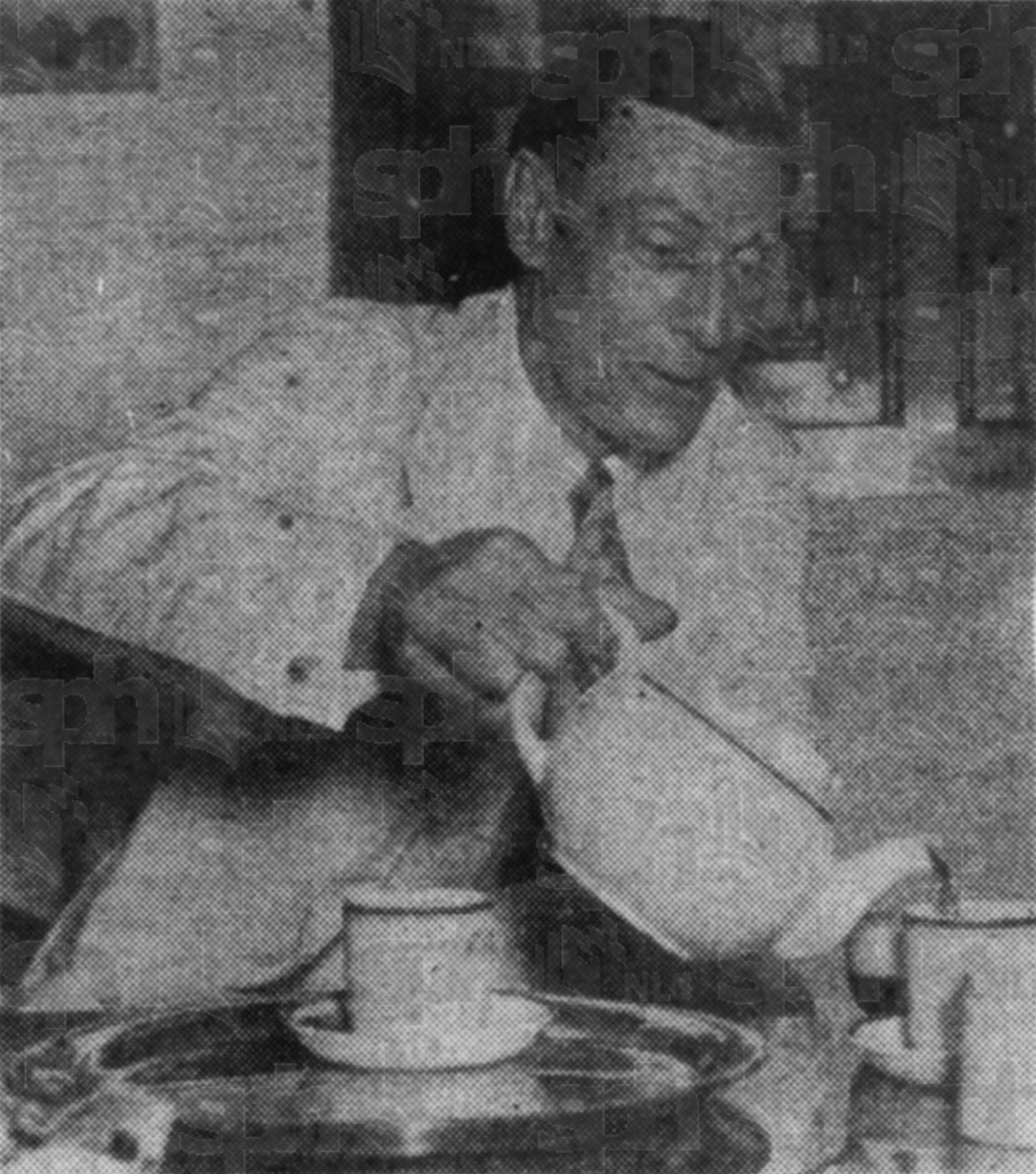
MacBryan, following his discharge from the mental hospital in 1950

Upon arriving in Singapore on 22 June, MacBryan was detained at the Mental Hospital until mid-August under a Colonial Secretary's order. After his release, he planned to go to London to press the princess' case with the Colonial Office, bringing the tongkat ular with him. Back in London on 21 August, his attempts to engage with Colonial Office officials about the succession were unsuccessful, and he reportedly suffered a mental breakdown, including an incident where he tried to direct traffic at Piccadilly Circus. He was subsequently committed to the mental hospital at Epsom by his sister. On his return to Johannesburg, he published a letter in The Times claiming the late Sultan's desire to renegotiate Brunei's constitutional arrangements and to form a “British Bornean Union” with Sarawak and North Borneo, supported by Brunei's oil revenues.

MacBryan kept flooding the Colonial Office with letters from Johannesburg about the Brunei succession and the redrafting of British treaties. He forwarded copies of letters from Sultan Ahmad Tajuddin and Brooke to Brunei's State Council in March 1951, but Sultan Omar Ali Saifuddien rejected them because he didn't think they were required. After protesting to the Colonial Office, a resolution was passed prohibiting him from entering Brunei. Nevertheless, he intended to travel there to file a lawsuit against the British Resident and defend the late Sultan's directives once he had confirmed with the office that his visit would not be opposed.

Back in London by August 1951, MacBryan wrote to The Times over oil royalties but was unable to get a meeting with officials from the Colonial Office. After arriving back in Johannesburg, he decided to travel to British Hong Kong rather than Singapore, where he had originally intended to visit Sarawak and see Governor Anthony Abell. There, shortly before Christmas 1953, he died at a motel under mysterious circumstances. His intentions failing and his mental condition getting worse might have played a part in his death. (Note: It's noteworthy that there isn't any documentation of a Hong Kong police investigation or coroner's inquest about MacBryan's demise. Furthermore, no information is available on his burial place. The British anthropologist Stephen Morris conducted personal investigations in the 1980s, but he was unable to find any evidence. Following MacBryan's death, the government of Hong Kong kept the documents that were discovered with him. In October 1955, they were sent to the Colonial Office, which then sent them to MacBryan's third wife, Frances (NA CO 537/1635). Out of all the documents found, the last one had a date of November 3, 1953. Averil Mackenzie-Grieve, Sir Dennis White, the Rajah, and the Ranee all provided distinct versions of MacBryan's demise.) Brooke believed that he hanged himself, while Sylvia thought he had starved himself to death. In her final mention of him in her book, she described him as "down-and-out, filthy and in rags," despite having thousands of dollars in the bank. She portrayed him as a man consumed by "charmed and twisted dreams of powers" and admitted, "I never dared ask Vyner what he thought about the downfall of his friend." The tongkat ular, which he had brought with him to London, vanished and has never been found again, making its actual importance unclear. (Note: The official list of the 38 regalia used during Sultan Hassanal Bolkiah's 1972 coronation makes no mention of the tongkat ular.)

== Honours ==
- Companion of the Order of the Star of Sarawak (CSS; 22 July 1941)
