= Sarawak State Secretary =

State Secretary (Sarawak)

- Ketua Setiausaha Sarawak
- Coat of arms of Sarawak
- Incumbent; Mohamad Abu Bakar bin Marzuki since 21 July 2022
- Style: Yang Berhormat
- Abbreviation: KSS
- Member of: Cabinet of Sarawak
- Reports to: Premier of Sarawak
- Nominator: Premier of Sarawak
- Appointer: Yang di-Pertua Negeri of Sarawak; on the advice of the Premier
- Formation: 1 October 1923; 103 years ago
- Website: premierdept.sarawak.gov.my/web/subpage/staffcontact_view/35

The Sarawak State Secretary is the chief administrative officer of the State Government of Sarawak and professional head of the Sarawak Civil Service. The role acts as the senior policy adviser to the Premier of Sarawak and state Cabinet, and as the secretary to the Cabinet is responsible to all state ministers for the efficient running of government. The role is currently occupied by Mohamad Abu Bakar bin Marzuki.

== Origins ==
The position created as the Chief Secretary for the Raj of Sarawak which was created in 1923. In 1932, the post was renamed to Government Secretary until 1937, reverting to chief secretary. The post was also called the Officer Administrating the Government (OAG). After the formation of Malaysia in 1963, the post was renamed to State Secretary which remains today.

== Responsibilities ==
The State Secretary reports directly to the Premier of Sarawak and leads the Department of the Premier of Sarawak and is assisted by several deputies.

== List of secretaries ==
=== Chief Secretary of the Raj of Sarawak, 1923–1946 ===
Prior to the creation of the office of Chief Secretary, the Resident of Kuching Division acted as the chief advisor to the Rajah.

John Coney Moulton, formerly a museum curator, was appointed the first Chief Secretary of the Raj government.

#	Portrait	Name	Term of office	
1		John Coney Moulton	1 October 1923	6 June 1926
2		Harold Brooke Crocker	1 January 1928	5 May 1929
3		Francis Farrington Boult	1 January 1930	1 May 1931
4		Charles Frederick Macaskie	10 September 1932	7 November 1934
5		Edward Parnell	1 March 1937	1 April 1939
6		John Belville Archer	1 April 1939	2 May 1941
7		Cyril Le Gros Clark	2 May 1941	6 July 1945
8		John Belville Archer	15 April 1946	1 July 1946

=== Chief Secretary of the Crown Colony of Sarawak, 1946–1963 ===
On 1 July 1946, the Crown Colony of Sarawak was created after the dissolution of the British Military Administration.

#	Portrait	Name	Term of office	
1		Christopher William Dawson	1 July 1946	23 February
2		Robert Gordon Aikman	23 February 1950	6 May 1955
3		J.H. Ellis	6 May 1955	22 March 1958
4		John C.H. Barcroft	May 1958	6 June 1958
5		Francis Derek Jakeway	April 1959	22 July 1963

=== State Secretary of Sarawak from 1963 ===
On 22 July 1963, the United Kingdom granted independence to Sarawak as a sovereign state before it formally joined the Federation of Malaysia on 16 September 1963.

#	Portrait	Name	Term of office	
1		George A.T. Shaw	22 July 1963	26 August 1966
2		Gerunsin Lembat	1 September 1966	14 March 1979
3		Abang Yusuf bin Abang Puteh	1979	1984
4		Bujang bin Mohamad Nor	1984	1992
5		Hamid bin Bugo	1992	2000
6		Abdul Aziz bin Husain	August 2000	December 2006
7		Wilson Baya Dandot	January 2007	3 August 2009
8		Morshidi Abdul Ghani	3 August 2009	22 August 2019
9		Jaul Samion	22 August 2019	22 July 2022
10		Abu Bakar bin Marzuki	22 July 2022	Incumbent

== Bibliography ==
- Jabatan Premier Sarawak. (2026, May 15). Sejarah Setiausaha Kerajaan Negeri. https://premierdept.sarawak.gov.my/web/subpage/webpage_view/471/SShttps://premierdept.sarawak.gov.my/web/subpage/webpage_view/471/SS
- Sarawak Development Institute. (2024). Sarawak civil service administration and development: Reflections and reminiscences over 60 years. Faradale Media-M Sdn. Bhd. https://sdi.com.my/wp-content/uploads/2025/11/Sarawaks-Civil-Service-%E2%80%93-Administration-and-Development-Reflections-and-Reminiscences-over-60-Years-Final-Version-min.pdf
- Talib, N. S. (1999). Administrators and their service: The Sarawak administrative service under the Brooke Rajahs and British colonial rule. Oxford University Press. https://dokumen.pub/administrators-and-their-service-the-sarawak-administrative-service-under-the-brooke-rajahs-and-british-colonial-rule-9835600317-9789835600319.html
- The Sarawak Gazette (1958, March 31). 84(1201). https://www.pustaka-sarawak.com/gazette/gazette_uploaded/1395129035.pdf
- The Sarawak Gazette (1971, November 30). 97(1365). https://www.pustaka-sarawak.com/gazette/gazette_uploaded/1404377812.pdf

== Additional reading ==
- Harding, A. (2017). Devolution of Powers in Sarawak: A Dynamic Process of Redesigning Territorial Governance in a Federal System. Asian Journal of Comparative Law, 12(2), 257–279. https://doi.org/10.1017/asjcl.2017.13
- Yeoh, T. (2021). Reviving the Spirit of Federalism: Decentralisation Policy Options for a New Malaysia. Institute for Democracy and Economic Affairs (IDEAS). https://www.ideas.org.my/wp-content/uploads/2021/04/PI59-Reviving-the-Spirit-of-Federalism.pdf
