= Frederick Le Gros Clark (author) =

English social and industrial reformer

- Born: 3 September 1892; Chislet, Kent, England
- Died: 22 September 1977 (aged 85); Cambridge, England
- Education: Blundell's School; Balliol College, Oxford
- Occupation(s): Author, doctor, expert on malnutrition
- Relatives: Wilfrid Le Gros Clark (brother); Cyril Drummond Le Gros Clark (brother); Frederick Le Gros Clark (grandfather)

Frederick Le Gros Clark (3 September 1892 – 22 September 1977) was a British children's author, and an expert on malnutrition.

== Early life ==
Frederick Le Gros Clark was born on 3 September 1892 in Chislet, Kent, England, the son of Rev. Edward Travers Clark, and his wife Ethel May. His grandfather was the surgeon Frederick Le Gros Clark (1811-1892).

He was awarded a scholarship for Blundell's School, Tiverton from 1906, and a scholarship to study Classics at Balliol College, Oxford in 1911, but did not complete his studies before his studies were halted by the War. He served throughout the First World War, and had an accident on the very last day, losing his right hand and his sight in both eyes.

In 1937, Clark and his wife Ida published The Adventures of the Little Pig (1937), a children's book with a left-wing political message. The book was praised by Sylvia Townsend Warner in Left News and Harry Pollitt in the Daily Worker.

His brother was Sir Wilfrid Le Gros Clark, Professor of Anatomy at the University of Oxford and the University of London.

== Career ==
In the 1930s he became aware of the problems caused by malnutrition and worked to improve children's health through the provision of school meals and milk. In 1938 he became secretary of The Children's Nutrition Council, and in 1939, he co-wrote "Our Food Problem and Its Relation to Our National Defences". In 1976 he was interviewed by the historian, Brian Harrison as part of his Suffrage Interviews project, titled Oral evidence on the suffragette and suffragist movements: the Brian Harrison interviews, which includes discussion of his work with Eva Hubback and Eleanor Rathbone on campaigns and committees to improve the nutrition of children.

== Publications ==
- Apparition (1928) - adult novel
- Between Two Men (1935) - adult novel
- The Adventures of the Little Pig (1937) - for children
- The Deep Shelter Mystery - for children
- Audrey in the Spring - for children
- Our Food problem and its relation to our National Defences, with RM Titmuss (1939)
- Editor of Four Thousand Million Mouths - Scientific Humanism and the Shadow of World Hunger (1959)
- Aging in Industry with A. C. Dunne (1956)
- Growing Old in a Mechanised World (1960)
- The Years Still Unexplored with F. S. Milligan (1964)
- Blinded in War for St Dunstan's Foundation (1969)

== Personal life ==
He married Ida Clark. His second wife was Winifred.

Le Gros Clark died in Cambridge on 22 September 1977, aged 85.
