= Longhai =

Longhai may refer to:

- Longhai District, a district in Zhangzhou, Fujian, China
- Longhai Campaign, 1946 campaign during Chinese Civil War
- Longhai Railway, China's east–west railway artery
