= Wilfrid Le Gros Clark =

British scientist and surgeon

- Born: Wilfrid Edward Le Gros Clark; 5 June 1895
- Died: 28 June 1971 (aged 76)
- Awards: Fellow of the Royal Society; Royal Medal (1961); Karl Spencer Lashley Award (1971)
- Scientific career
- Institutions: St Thomas' Hospital; University of Oxford; Royal Army Medical Corps; University College London
- Website: ucl.ac.uk/cdb/about/history/clark

Sir Wilfrid Edward Le Gros Clark (5 June 1895 – 28 June 1971) was a British anatomist, surgeon, primatologist and palaeoanthropologist, today best remembered for his contribution to the study of human evolution. He was one of three men who proved that the Piltdown Man was a forgery, and was Dr Lee's Professor of Anatomy at the University of Oxford.

== Education ==
Le Gros Clark was educated at Blundell's School in Devon and subsequently admitted as a medical student to St Thomas' Hospital Medical School in Lambeth.

== Career ==
After qualification he immediately joined the Royal Army Medical Corps as a medical officer and was sent to France early in 1918. He caught diphtheria and was sent back to England to recover, following which he spent the remainder of the war as a medical officer at '‘No. 8 Stationary Hospital'’ at Wimereux in northern France.

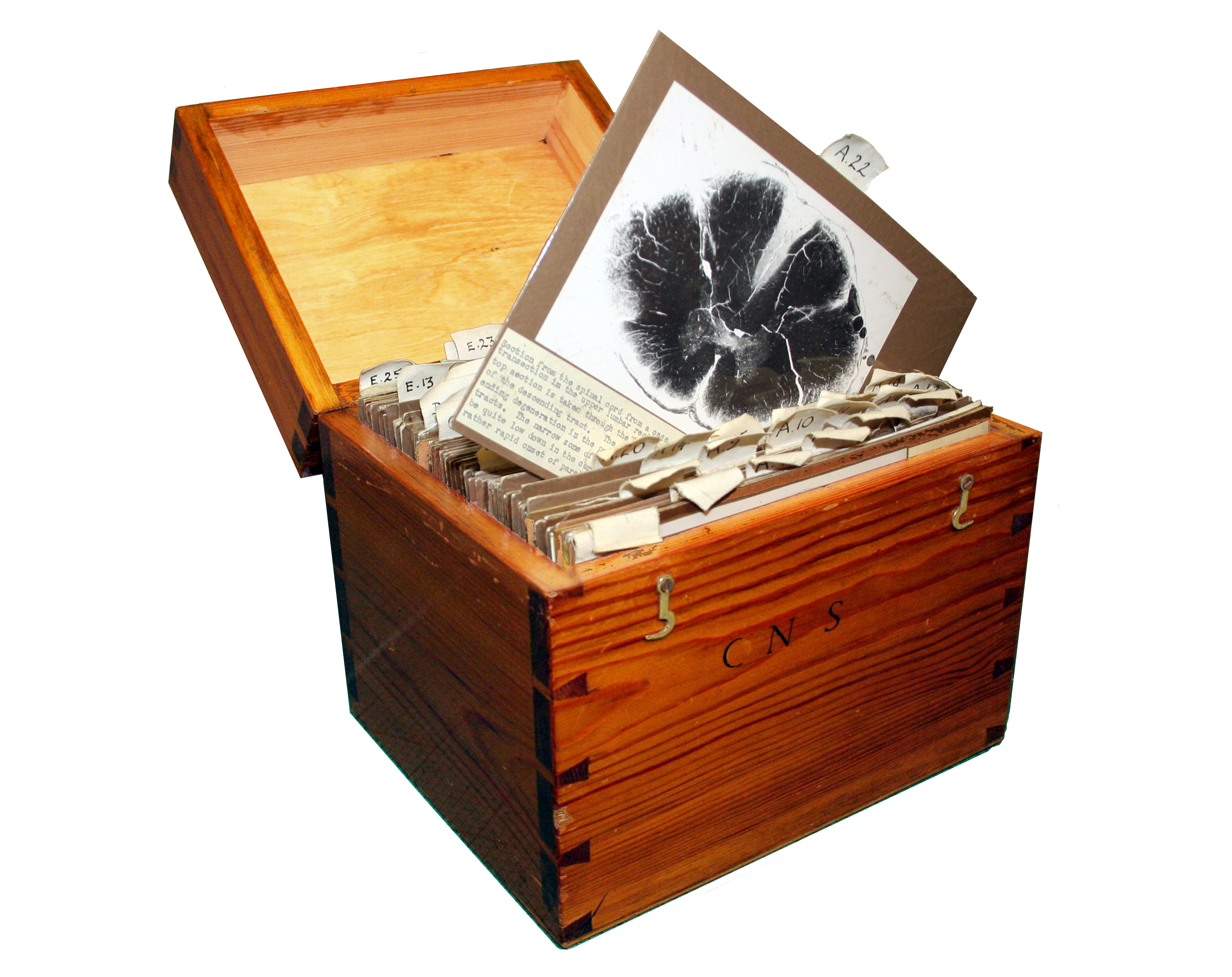
Box of cards containing photomicrographs and notes on salient features to accompany Le Gros Clark's histology demonstration slides on the Central nervous system

Following a period in the Department of Anatomy at St Thomas' Hospital Medical School he was appointed as Principal Medical Officer to the Sarawak Government. He was subsequently appointed as Professor of Anatomy at St Bartholomew's Hospital Medical School, followed by a period as Professor of Anatomy at St Thomas' Hospital Medical School and finally, in 1934, he was invited to take over as the Dr. Lee's Professor of Anatomy (and effectively the Chair of the Anatomy Department) at the University of Oxford. The following year he was elected a Fellow of the Royal Society. Le Gros Clark was also editor of the Journal of Anatomy between 1938 and 1945.

In 1953, Le Gros Clark was one of three men (the others being Joseph Weiner and Kenneth Oakley) who proved that the Piltdown Man was a forgery.

In 1960, Le Gros Clark was elected to the American Philosophical Society. In 1963, He was elected to the National Academy of Sciences. He was awarded the Royal Society's Royal Medal in 1961 and delivered their Ferrier Lecture in 1956. He was elected president of the Anatomical Society of Great Britain and Ireland for 1951 to 1953.

Papers relating to Le Gros Clark, his grandfather the surgeon Frederick Le Gros Clark and his brother Cyril Le Gros Clark (former Chief Secretary of Sarawak, who was murdered by the Japanese in 1945 after a period of detention at Batu Lintang camp in Borneo) are held at the Bodleian Library (Special Collections and Western Manuscripts) at Oxford University. During his career Le Gros Clark published numerous papers on human evolution and palaeontology, and an autobiography.
