= Frederick W. Clark =

Frederick William Clark (August 12, 1857 — February 2, 1916) was an American engineer, builder, and president of Clark Construction Company, which was responsible for many iconic buildings in Chicago from 1902 until 1909. Among the buildings that had the Clark imprint are the Charleston Navy Yard, the Art Institute of Chicago, the old Chicago and North Western Railway Station, and the Schlesinger & Mayer Department Store (later known as the Carson Pirie Scott Building).

Born in Chicago, Clark studied engineering at the Massachusetts Institute of Technology, Clark joined his father's construction company, Jonathon Clark Construction. Clark became president of the company, now Clark Construction Company, in 1902 when Jonathon Clark died.

Clark Construction disbanded in 1909 after finishing all contractual obligations. During his retirement, Clark was active in community groups such as the Union League Club and the Kenwood Country Club. His legacy as a successful builder continues in Chicago today, as he oversaw the construction of the Art Institute of Chicago, the Chicago and North Western Railway Station and the Carson Pirie Scott Building.

F. W. Clark died in Chicago at the age of 58.
