= Fred Clarke (footballer, born 1941) =

Northern Irish former footballer

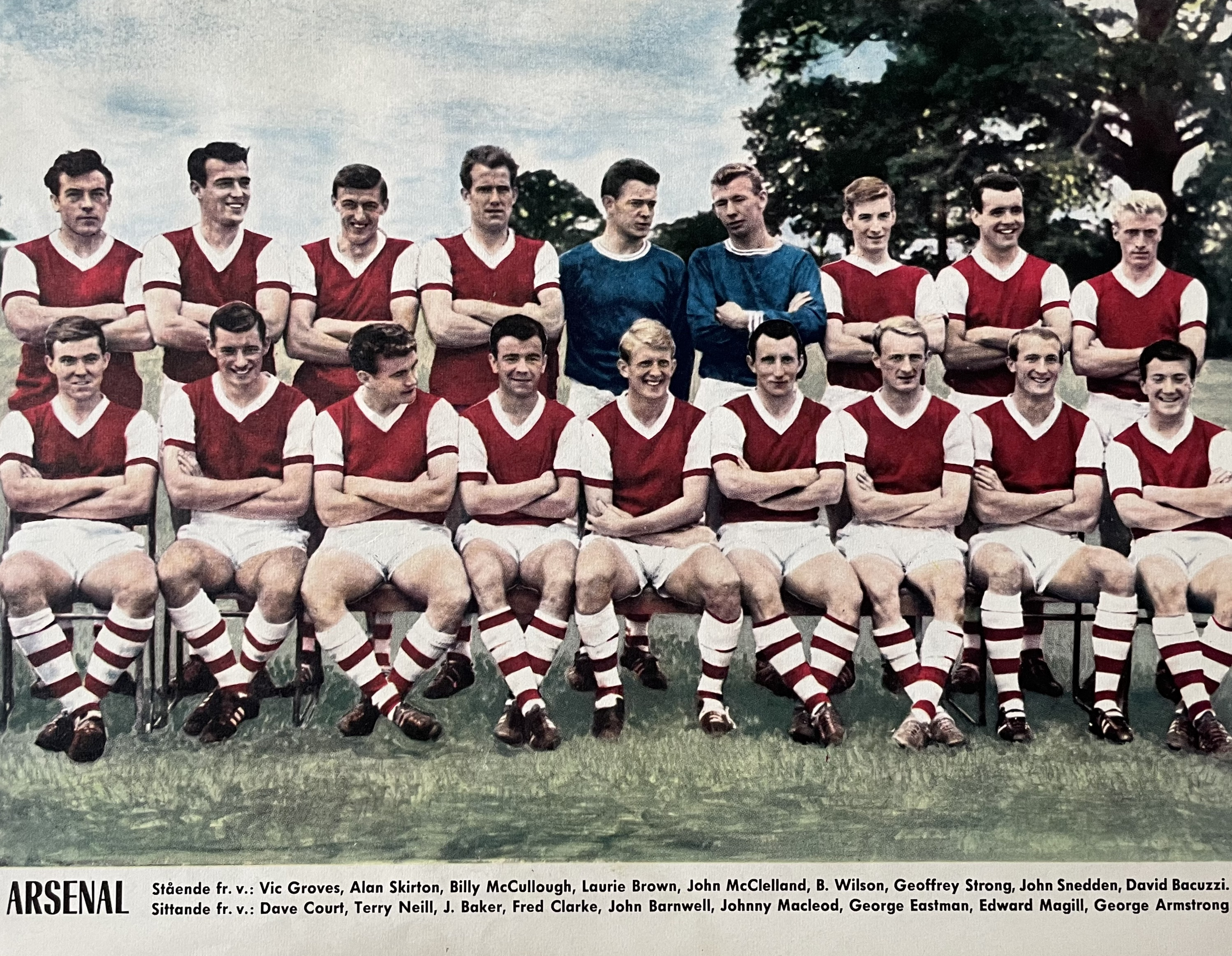

Personal information
- Full name: Frederick Robert George Clarke
- Date of birth: 4 November 1941 (age 84)
- Place of birth: Banbridge, Northern Ireland
- Height: 5 ft 7 in (1.70 m)
- Position: Defender

Senior career*
| Years | Team | Apps | (Gls) |
- Glenavon
| 1961–1965 | Arsenal | 26 | (0) |
- Glenavon

International career
| 1960 | Northern Ireland Amateurs | 1 | (0) |
| 1962–1965 | Northern Ireland U23 | 4 | (0) |
- * Club domestic league appearances and goals

Frederick Robert George Clarke (born 4 November 1941) is a Northern Irish former footballer who played in the Football League for Arsenal.
