= Bahasa Istana =

Bahasa Istana (Palace Language) or Bahasa Dalam (Internal Language) is a Malay sociolect used among the Brunei and Malaysian royal families either for internal communication or when announcing the affairs of the king or sultan. It is a polite language that is used for interactions between individuals of different social groups, such as between nobility and commoners, on both formal and informal occasions.

== In Brunei ==
In the context of Brunei Malay, Bahasa Dalam is better known as Bahasa Raja-Raja or Bahasa Orang Istana.

=== History ===
Bahasa Dalam has been the official language of the Sultan's inner court for generations. The Brunei Bay region has been home to a civilization from the 7th century, according to archeological evidence, and Bahasa Dalam, a social register of Malay, evolved to reflect the monarchy's rank. The existence of the traditional classification that still permeates this sultanate encouraged the development of Bahasa Dalam as a language for communication between individuals of various social classes and still makes it easier to express the complex social divisions between aristocrats, nobles, and commoners.

=== Uses ===
Bahasa Dalam is not only used by the royal family, but also by people in the upper class who hold titles, important roles in society, or certain positions in the government. Most of those who are proficient in using Bahasa Dalam come from Kampong Ayer and live along the Brunei River. The language sometimes utilises a different vocabulary from the commonly used Brunei Malay. At other times, it uses the more common vocabulary, but is spoken with a lowered tone and intonation, soft, polite and arranged in a figurative context.

When speaking with royalty and nobility, others should utilise Bahasa Dalam as a sign of respect. The language is the language register used by royalty and the palace household. Speaking in Bahasa Dalam is customary in palaces and on ceremonial occasions. In terms of functionality, it consists of expressions with unique connotations that can be used to address or make reference to aristocrats and other members of the royal family. It is known for its courteous, respectful, and refined language. Finally, using metaphor and innuendo to express meaning is one way it is used.

=== Importance ===
The national MIB philosophy of Brunei is congruent with the continuous utilisation of Bahasa Dalam. In fact, because it is related to all three strands of MIB, it is intimately bound to it. Bahasa Dalam innovations and changes require approval from the Jabatan Adat-Istiadat Negara and are not made arbitrarily. All such modifications must to be extensively communicated to the general public so that they can stay informed about current practices. The language will be utilised as long as there is a monarchy. Nevertheless, despite the limitations of prescriptive regulation, the language remains susceptible to linguistic change, much like other Malay dialects.

== In Malaysia ==
Bahasa Istana is a dialect rich in courtesy and politeness. It is used for communication between the royal family and the common people or when talking about the affairs of the ruler and the palace, especially in an official context.

== Vocabulary ==
The vocabulary of Bahasa Istana is as follows:

Bahasa Istana	Malay	English
Almarhum	Allahyarham	The deceased
ampun kurnia	maaf	sorry
anugerah	beri; hadiah	give; award
baginda	dia (rakyat menyapa raja)	he (people greeting the king)
beradu	tidur	sleep
berangkat	berlepas; bertolak	take off; leave
mencemar duli	berjalan; pergi ke	walk; go to
berkenan	sudi / suka akan	willing / willing to
berputera	melahirkan anak lelaki	gave birth to a son
bersabda	berkata	said
bersiram	mandi	shower
bertitah	berkata / menyuruh	said / ordered
beta	saya (raja)	I (king)
daulat	bahagia	happy
gering	sakit	sick
hari keputeraan	hari jadi seseorang	someone's birthday
hulu	kepala	head
iram-iram	payung	umbrella
kaus	kasut	shoes
kurnia	beri; hadiah	give; gifts
mahkota	topi	hat
makam	kubur	grave
mangkat	meninggal dunia	die
menghadap	menjumpai	find
murka	marah	angry
patik	saya (rakyat menghadap raja)	I (people facing the king)
peraduan	tempat tidur	bed
permaisuri	isteri baginda	his wife
putera	anak lelaki baginda	his son
puteri	anak perempuan baginda	his daughter
santap	makan	eat
semayam	duduk; tinggal	sit down; stay
sembah	memberi salam	greet
singgahsana	kerusi	chair
titah	kata; perintah	said; command
