= List of roads in Kuching =

This article contains an alphabetical list of notable roads within Kuching, Sarawak, Malaysia.

== Roads ==
Current name	Former name	Notes	Chinese name
Chinese People
Jalan Ang Cheng Hoe			洪清河路
Jalan Ewe Hai		Named by the Rajah after Tan Sri Ong Kee Hui's great grandfather, in the 1890s after completion of the shophouses. This street connects Carpenter Grimace Street to Wayang Street in downtown Kuching City. Ewe Hai Street was built by prominent local Chinese leader Ong Ewe Hai after the great Kuching fire sometime in 1885 or 1886. He named it after himself but left out his surname out of respect for the Rajah because Ong means King in Hokkien. Rajah Charles Brooke had appointed Ewe Hai as the Kapitan China of Sarawak. He was a very successful merchant and was a close confidant to the Rajah on all Chinese affairs.	友海街
Jalan Khoo Hun Yeang		Named by Khoo Hun Yeang around 1902 to 1906, son of Khoo Thean Teik	汉阳街
Jalan Ban Hock		Named after the Ban Hock Kongsi at 1907, a construction company owned by Yeo Guan Chow(杨源抄).	万福路
Lorong Ban Hock		Named after the Ban Hock Kongsi, a construction company owned by Yeo Guan Chow(杨源抄).	万福巷
Lorong Kai Joo		Named for Teo Kai Joo(張開裕), a Teochewese businessman in Raj of Sarawak, might after 1924.	開裕巷 (砂厘巷)
Jalan Ong Tiang Swee		Named by the Rajah in the early 1930s. Named after Tan Sri Ong Kee Hui's grandfather, the Chinese Kapitan of Sarawak appointed by Rajah Brooke. It is situated at Mile 2 1/2 which connects Jalan Rock to Jalan Uplands. Along the stretch is Ong Tiang Swee School which land was gifted by Tiang Swee to the government to build a school.	王长水路
Jalan Ong Hup Leong		Named by the Rajah in the 1940s. Named after Tan Sri Ong Kee Hui junior uncle, the Exco Member of the Rajah's Supreme Council. The members of the Ong family hold the record of having 5 roads named after them. This road is situated as an offshoot of Ong Tiang Swee Road which leads into a residential estate. Hup Leong was the 4th son of Tiang Swee, he became one of the first Supreme Council members appointed by the Rajah to represent the local Chinese.	王合隆路
Jalan Ong Kwan Hin		Named around 1956 after the completion of the road. Named after Tan Sri Ong Kee Hui's father, the president and chairman of the Kuching Hokkien Association. Ong Kwan Hin was the Honorary Guardian of all the Buddhist/Taoist Shrines and temples in Kuching and was a Chairman of the Sarawak Hokkien Association for many years.	王觀興路
Jalan Stephen Yong		At Batu Kawa, named in 1973 for contribution of Stephen Yong Kuet Tze. 1968 to 1973 original road name was Jalan Wee Hood Teck(拿督黄佛德路), son of United Overseas Bank founder Wee Kheng Chiang.	楊國斯路
Jalan Datuk Wee Kheng Chiang		Named after businessman and co-founder of United Overseas Bank（Wee Kheng Chiang）, might after 1978.	拿督黄庆昌路
Jalan Chong Kiun Kong		Pass through Kenyalang Park	張君光路
Jalan Song Thian Cheok		Named after a local councillor, might around 1990.	宋天祝路
Jalan Tan Sri Datuk William Tan		Named after Tan Sri Datuk William Tan, the first president of Kuching Municipal Council, might named around late-1990.	陈何遵路
Jalan Ong Kee Hui		Named after Tan Sri Ong Kee Hui, the founder and President of Sarawak's first political party, SUPP, former mayor of Kuching, MP for Bandar Kuching and former Minister in the Malaysian Cabinet, might around 2000.	王其辉路
Jalan Hui Sing		Named after Tan Sri Ong Kee Hui and Ong Moh Sing upon the completion of the road. Hui Sing is today a major residential area.	辉盛路
Jalan Datuk Temenggong Tan Meng Chong		Named after former Padungan assemblyman, Datuk Temenggong Tan Meng Chong who first became a board member in 1964, might around 2003.	天猛公拿督陈明聪路
Jalan Chong Ted Tsiung		Named after the third Kuching South Mayor, Chong Ted Tsiung, might around 2007.	张德松路
Jalan Tan Sri Datuk Amar Wee Boon Ping		Named around October 2020, from 4.5 miles of Kuching to Jalan Stephen Yong	丹斯里拿督阿玛黄文彬路
Malay People
Jalan Tunku Abdul Rahman	Thomson Road	Originally named after Peter Duguid Thomson, who worked for the Borneo Company from 1864-1916, some of the time at their Kuching office on this road; renamed after the first prime minister of Malaysia, Tunku Abdul Rahman.	东姑阿都拉曼路
Jalan Datuk Ajibah Abol	Datu's Road	Renamed after Sarawak's first female minister.	
Jalan Tun Abang Haji Openg	Rock Road	Originally named after a 20 feet high by 8 feet long rock, or batu kinyang (stone crystal), at the second milestone out of town. The Kuching end was renamed after the first governor of Sarawak under Malaysia, Abang Haji Openg, but it continues south as Jalan Rock.	大石路
Jalan Tun Ahmad Zaidi Adruce	Jalan Kereta Api	Originally the course of the Sarawak Government Railway (kereta api). Renamed after Ahmad Zaidi Adruce, the fifth Governor of Sarawak.	火車路
Sarawak Native
Jalan Tun Jugah		Named after Jugah Barieng, the Paramount Chief of the Iban people for more than 55 years.	敦朱加路
Western People
Jalan McDougall	McDougall Road	Named after the first Bishop of Labuan and Sarawak, Francis McDougall.	麦陀尔路
Jalan Crookshank	Crookshank Road	Named after the nephew of the Rajah James Brooke, Arthur Chichester Crookshank, who served in Sarawak for three decades from 1843.	老打鸡山路
Jalan Bampfylde	Bampfylde Road	Named after Charles Agar Bampfylde, who served in Sarawak from 1875-1903, later as Resident of First Division.	邦斐路
Jalan Rodway		Named after the first commander of the Sarawak Rangers, William Henry Rodway.	罗威路
Jalan Ellis		Named after the superintendent of Public Works and Survey, Henry Disney Ellis. He served for ten years from 1897 as Superintendent of Public Works, Surveys and Land.	黄土路
Jalan Deshon		Named after Henry FitzGibbon (sic) Deshon, who served in Sarawak from 1876-1904, latterly as Resident of the First Division.	德圣路
Jalan Mathie	Mathie's Road	Named after John Mathie, a Scottish naval engineer who served in the Government's ships from 1872 until 1902.	马提斯路
Jalan Abell		Named after the 3rd Governor of Sarawak, Sir Anthony Abell.	艾贝尔路
Others
Jalan Padungan	Padungan Road	Named after Kampung Padungan, once the largest Malay Village in Kuching.	浮罗岸路
Jalan Petanak			毕打那路
Jalan Sekama			昔加码路
Jalan Main Bazaar	Main Bazaar	Named after the Main Bazaar, the first bazaar in Kuching.	海唇街
Jalan Gambier	Gambier Road	Named after Gambier which was the main export in 1894.	甘密街
Jalan India	Kling Street	Named after the row of Indian shops, Indians having been referred to as Klings.	印度街
Jalan Carpenter	Carpenter Street	Named as the street used to house small carpenters workshops.	亞答街
Jalan Central Timur	Central Road West		中央路
Jalan Taman Budaya	Pearse's Road	Named after Charles Samuel Pearse who served in the Sarawak Treasury from 1875 to 1898.	文化路
Lorong Park	Pig Lane		老鼠园路
Lebuh Temple		Named after the Tua Pek Kong Temple.	神庙街
Jalan Kwong Lee Bank		Named after the Kwong Lee Bank, the first Chinese bank in Kuching.	广利银行路
Jalan Pending		Named from an English word for waiting after the cargo ships which anchored there "pending" loading.	朋岭路
Jalan Lumba Kuda		(Horse Race in English) Named after the first Turf Club in Kuching	跑马场路
Jalan Market		Named after the open-air market located around here.	马吉街
Jalan Power		Named after the electric power station that was built at here in 1922.	电力街
Lebuh Java		Named after the Javanese Village which were located here during the early 20th century.	爪哇街
Jalan Hup Kee			合記路
Lorong Taman Seng Goon			承恩花園巷
Jalan Bako			峇哥路
Jalan Mendu			盟都路
Jalan Foochow 1			福州第一路
