= Stephen Yong Kuet Tze =

Malaysian politician

Yang Berbahagia Tan Sri Datuk Amar Stephen Yong Kuet Tze PSM DA
- 杨国斯

Minister of Science, Technology and Environment
- In office 1982 – 26 October 1990
- Prime Minister: Mahathir Mohamad
- Preceded by: Ong Kee Hui
- Succeeded by: Law Hieng Ding

Personal details
- Party: Sarawak United Peoples' Party

Tan Sri Datuk Amar Stephen Yong Kuet Tze (simplified Chinese: 杨国斯; traditional Chinese: 楊國斯; pinyin: Yáng Guósī; Pha̍k-fa-sṳ: Yòng Koet-sṳ̂; 2 June 1921 – 4 July 2001, Sarawak, Malaysia) was a former Cabinet Minister in Malaysia. He was the Secretary-General of the Sarawak United Peoples' Party (SUPP) from 1959 to 1982.

== Deputy Chief Minister ==
Stephen Yong became the deputy chief minister of Sarawak from 1970 to 1974. On several occasions, Tan Sri Stephen Yong acted as the chief minister when Abdul Rahman Ya'kub went on frequent trips to Kuala Lumpur and elsewhere which Stephen Yong described as "irritating". Stephen had to chair the State Operation Committee, State Industrial Development Committee, and other committees. Stephen also acted on behalf of Rahman Ya'kub as chief minister in Council Negri (now Sarawak state legislative assembly) meetings where he had to answer dozens of questions in the sittings.

In February 1972, Yong proposed a training programme to Rahman Ya'kub on school leavers to work on government-operated farms; to instill a sense of discipline and knowledge on farming in students. Rahman Ya'kub accepted the proposal however the Malaysian federal government would not provide funds because there were not enough trainers available. The training project was shelved later.

On 25 March 1972, Malaysian government proposed to take over the administration of Chinese schools in Sarawak because of communist subversive activities happening in the schools. Yong objected to the idea, stating that only a small number of students were involved in such activities and the majority of the activities happened outside of schools. Besides, those suspected have been detained and deported outside of the Sarawak state. Abdul Rahman Ya'kub supported Yong's assessment based on reports by the special police branch. The plan to take over Chinese schools by the federal government did not materialise.

After Yong lost the Kuching Timor state seat in the 1974 Sarawak state election, Rahman Ya'kub allowed Stephen Yong to continue to chair the state Rehabilitation Committee. Yong vacated the deputy chief minister post to Sim Kheng Hong, one of his party committee members. Stephen Yong chose Wong Soon Kai over Chong Siew Chiang (张守江) to take over a cabinet minister post left by Sim. This caused dissatisfaction in Chong because Yong did not choose his clansmen to head the cabinet minister's post. In 1978, Chong brought in the Peninsular-based Democratic Action Party (DAP) into Sarawak. Chong argued that "SUPP had become different. They were no longer fighting for the interests of the Chinese. The party was fighting for an independent university and had also vowed to use the party’s logo in elections, but they (party leaders) just changed overnight." Meanwhile, other people claimed that Chong quit SUPP because he did not get a ministerial post.

== Question of support towards Abdul Rahman Ya'kub ==
On 23 January 1978, Abdul Rahman Ya'kub celebrated his 50th birthday. A 24-day celebration was planned. Yong and Prime Minister Hussein Onn thought such a celebration was too expensive. Yong met Hussein Onn on 11 January. Yong told Hussein that the Sarawak National Party (SNAP) invited SUPP for a vote of no confidence against Rahman Ya'kub in the Council Negri. Yong and Hussein did not oppose such an idea, however, it may cause a political crisis in which the prime minister could be blamed for not maintaining the political stability there. Yong suggested a quiet departure for Rahman Ya'kub and the prime minister agreed. Yong supported the departure of Rahman Ya'kub because the way Rahman Ya'kub was running the state government was damaging to SUPP's public image. On 16 April 1978, Rahman Ya'kub invited Yong, Ong Kee Hui, and Sim Kheng Hong to a tea break. Yong told Rahman about SNAP's plan of motion of no confidence. Rahman Ya'kub then asked Yong and his colleagues whether SUPP would continue to support him after the next election, but nobody replied. Then Yong told Rahman that the Prime Minister preferred him to retire from politics. Rahman kept quiet after that.

On 28 April 1978, the PBB party convention was held in Kuching. The prime minister also came to attend the meeting. In that meeting, Rahman Ya'kub mentioned that communist subversives have been trying to penetrate SUPP by toppling existing party leaders. Yong told Rahman that he was living in the past and SUPP, as part of the coalition in the state government, had brought peace and stability to the state.

== Honours ==
=== Honour of Malaysia ===
- Malaysia
  - Commander of the Order of Loyalty to the Crown of Malaysia (PSM) – Tan Sri (1996)
- Sarawak
  - Knight Commander of the Order of the Star of Hornbill Sarawak (DA) – Datuk Amar (1981)
