= Frederick Le Gros Clark (surgeon) =

British surgeon

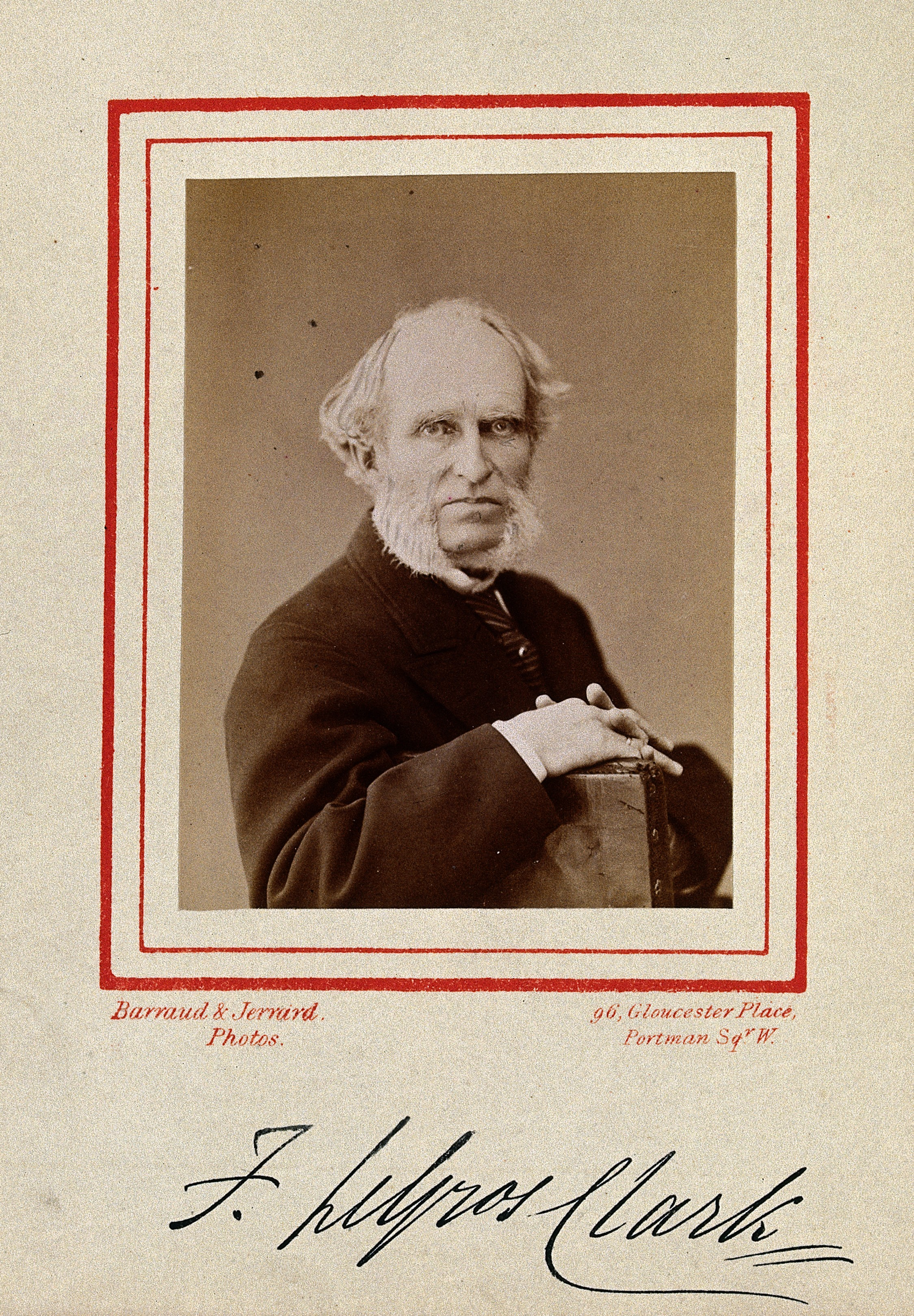
- Le Gros Clark in 1873
- Born: 8 February 1811; Mincing Lane, London, England
- Died: 19 July 1892 (aged 81); Sevenoaks, Kent, England
- Occupation: Surgeon
- Spouses: Harriet Ann Willmer; Henrietta Drummond
- Relatives: Wilfrid Le Gros Clark (grandson); Frederick Le Gros Clark (grandson)

Frederick Le Gros Clark FRS FRCS (8 February 1811 – 19 July 1892) was a British surgeon.

He was born in Mincing Lane, London, the son of a City merchant.

On 9 September 1841, he married Harriet Ann Willmer at St Marylebone, London. On 15 June 1858, he married Henrietta Drummond at Tenby, Pembrokeshire, Wales.

He died on 19 July 1892 at his home, The Thorns, Sevenoaks, Kent, England.
