= 1927 Birthday Honours =

British government recognitions

The 1927 Birthday Honours were appointments by King George V to various orders and honours to reward and highlight good works by citizens of the British Empire. The appointments were made to celebrate the official birthday of The King, and were published in The London Gazette on 3 June 1927.

The recipients of honours are displayed here as they were styled before their new honour, and arranged by honour, with classes (Knight, Knight Grand Cross, etc.) and then divisions (Military, Civil, etc.) as appropriate.

== United Kingdom and British Empire ==
=== Baron ===
- Sir Davison Alexander Dalziel Bt MP by the name, style and title of Baron Dalziel of Wooler, of Wooler in the County of Northumberland. Member of Parliament for Brixton division 1910-28 and since 1924. For political and public services.
- Sir Gilbert Greenall Bt CVO JP DL by the name, style and title of Baron Daresbury, of Walton, in the County of Chester. For political and public services.

=== Privy Councillor ===
The King appointed the following to His Majesty's Most Honourable Privy Council:

- Lieutenant-Colonel the Hon. George Frederick Stanley CMG MP Member of Parliament for Preston 1910-22 and for Willesden East since October, 1924, Parliamentary Secretary to the Ministry of Pensions since November, 1924. Comptroller of H.M. Household 1919-21; Financial Secretary to the War Office, 1921-22. Under Secretary of State for Home Affairs November 1922 to March 1923.

=== Baronetcies ===
- Sir John Brickwood. For political and public services in Portsmouth.
- Lieutenant Commander Geoffrey Cecil Congreve RN son of the late Governor and Commander-in-Chief, Malta
- Ernest Craig JP MP Member of Parliament for the Crewe division, 1912–1918 and since 1924
- Sir William Henry Neville Goschen KBE JP DL For public services.
- Reginald James Neville Neville JP MP Member of Parliament for Wigan, 1910–1918 and Norfolk East since 1924; Recorder of Bury St. Edmunds since 1905
- Sir Harry Benedetto Renwick KBE For political and public services in connection with electricity schemes.

=== Knight Bachelor ===
- Richard John Allison CBE FRIBA Principal Architect to H.M. Office of Works
- Augustus Gordon Grant Asher CBE WS County Clerk of Midlothian; Secretary of the Association of County Councils in Scotland
- Henry Edward Barker, For public services in Alexandria.
- Thomas James Barnes CBE Solicitor to the Board of Trade
- George Albert Bonner, King's Remembrancer and Senior Master of the Supreme Court
- William Burrell DL For public and political work and services to Art in Scotland.
- James Frederick Cleaver, For public services in Northern Ireland.
- Charles Clegg JP Chairman, Sheffield Local Employment Committee. For services to the Board of Trade and Ministry of Labour.
- Alderman James Crooks DL For political and public services in Lancashire. President of the Conservative Party in St. Helen's since 1918
- Leybourne Francis Watson Davidson. For services in connection with Empire Settlement.
- Arthur George Dilley MBE For political and public services in Huntingdonshire. Chairman of Huntingdonshire Conservative Association
- Edwin Evans DL For political and public services in Battersea
- William Claude Fawcett, Chairman of the Cleveland Conservative and Unionist Association. For political and public services in Yorkshire.
- Lieutenant-Colonel Arthur George Ferguson CBE H.M. Inspector of Constabulary for Scotland
- Thomas Edwards Forster KC DL For political and public services in Middlesex. Chairman of the Chiswick Conservative Association for 15 years
- John Haslam DL For political and public services in Lancashire.
- Lieutenant-Colonel Vivian Leonard Henderson MC MP Member of Parliament for Glasgow, Tradeston division, December, 1918–22, and for Bootle since 1924
- William George Lobjoit OBE late Controller of Horticulture, Ministry of Agriculture. For public services.
- Thomas James Leigh Maclachlan, Chief Organising Agent of the Conservative and Unionist Party, 1922-26. Principal Agent of the Conservative and Unionist Party, 1927
- John Larking, For philanthropic services.
- Charles James Martin CMG DCL FRS Director of the Lister Institute in London
- Henry Mechan. For political, public and philanthropic services in the west of Scotland
- Martin John Melvin, For political, public and philanthropic services in Birmingham.
- John Robert Pakeman CBE Past Chief Commoner of the City of London
- His Honour Judge Edward Abbott Parry JP late County Court Judge
- John Prosser WS Crown Agent in Scotland
- Alderman Walter Raine MP Chairman of Section "B" of the Local Legislation Committee. Member of Sunderland Town Council since 1902
- John Houldsworth Shaw, Solicitor to the Board of Inland Revenue
- Alderman James Benjamin Slade DL For political and public services in Leyton.
- William Calthrop Thorne JP Honorary Secretary to the Dock and Harbour Authorities Association

Dominions

- Lieutenant-Colonel Louis Edward Barnett CMG CM LRCP FRCS Professor of Surgery, Otago University, Dominion of New Zealand
- John Abraham Jacob de Villiers FRGS In recognition of services to the Government of Newfoundland.
- George Herbert Duckworth CB Chairman of the Irish Sailors and Soldiers Land Trust
- The Hon. Apirana Turupa Ngata, Member of the House of Representatives and formerly Member of the Executive Council, Dominion of New Zealand

British India

- James Donald CSI CIE Indian Civil Service, Vice President of the Executive Council, Bengal
- Justice Charles Gordon Hill Fawcett, Indian Civil Service, Puisne Judge, High Court of Judicature, Bombay
- Justice Zahhadur Rahim Zahid Suhrawardy, Puisne Judge, High Court of Judicature, Calcutta
- Manmohandas Ramji Vora, Member of the Council of State
- Sultan Ahmad, Vice-Chancellor of the Patna University
- Padamji Pestonji Ginwala, Member and Acting President of the Indian Tariff Board
- Francis Colomb Crawford CIE OBE Imperial Police (retired), lately Director-General of Police, His Exalted Highness the Nizam's Government, Hyderabad (Deccan)
- Khan Bahadur Sheikh Abdul Qadir, Member of the Punjab Legislative Council
- Thomas Mackenzie Ross, lately Chairman, Madras Chamber of Commerce
- David Elias David Ezra, late Sheriff of Calcutta
- Sorabjr Bezonji Mehta CIE Manager, Empress Mills, Nagpur
- U Po Tha CIE OBE Honorary Magistrate, Rangoon

Colonies, Protectorates, etc

- Edmund Davis, in recognition of his services in connection with the development of the mineral resources of the Empire.
- Anthony de Freitas OBE Chief Justice of British Guiana
- Aubrey Gregor Graham, Chief Construction Engineer, and Divisional Superintendent, Transportation Department, Government Railways, Nigeria
- Ugo Pasquale Mifsud Head of the Ministry and Minister for the Treasury, Malta
- Hippolyte Louis Wiehe du Coudray Souchon CBE In recognition of his services to Mauritius.

=== The Most Honourable Order of the Bath ===
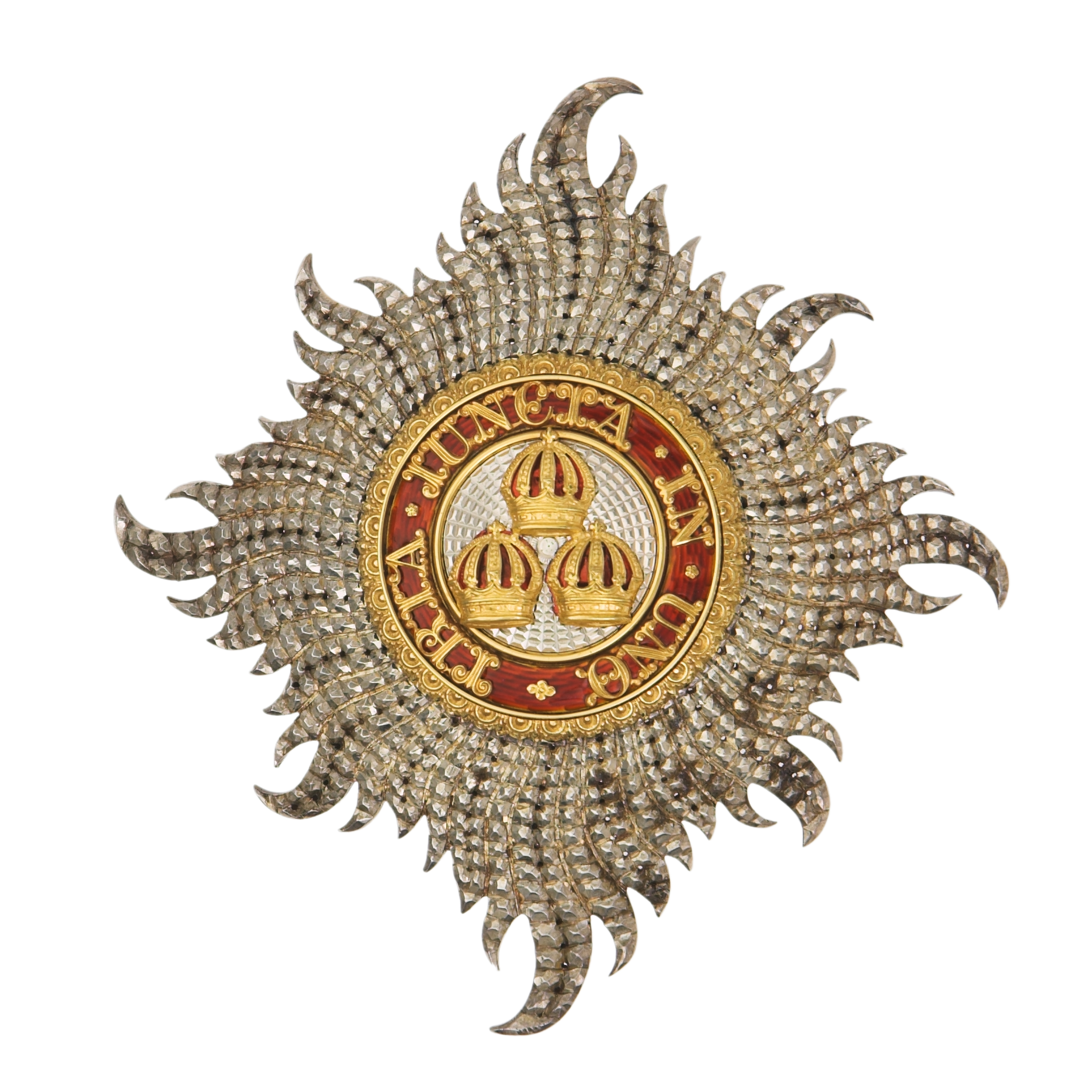
Civil star of the Knight Grand Cross of the Order of the Bath

==== Knight Grand Cross of the Order of the Bath (GCB) ====
===== Military Division =====
Royal Navy

- Admiral Sir Arthur Cavenagh Leveson KCB First and Principal Naval Aide-de-Camp to The King

===== Civil Division =====
- Alexander Albert, Marquess of Carisbrooke GCVO

==== Knight Commander of the Order of the Bath (KCB) ====
===== Military Division =====
Royal Navy

- Vice-Admiral the Hon. Sir Hubert George Brand KCMG KCVO CB

Army

- Major-General George McKenzie Franks CB General Officer Commanding, United Provinces District, India
- Major-General John Ponsonby CB CMG DSO Colonel, The Suffolk Regiment, late General Officer Commanding, Madras District, India
- Major-General Robert Archibald Cassels CB CSI DSO Indian Army, General Officer Commanding, Peshawar District, India
- Major-General John Henry Keith Stewart CB DSO Indian Army, General Officer Commanding, Aden Independent Brigade, and Political Resident, Aden

Royal Air Force

- Air Vice-Marshal Henry Robert Moore Brooke-Popham CB CMG DSO AFC

===== Civil Division =====
- Sir William George Tyrrell GCMG KCVO CB Permanent Under Secretary of State for Foreign Affairs
- Brigadier-General Sir Samuel Herbert Wilson KCMG KBE CB Permanent Under Secretary of State for the Colonies

==== Companion of the Order of the Bath (CB) ====
===== Military Division =====
Royal Navy

- Rear-Admiral William Douglas Paton DSO MVO
- Engineer Rear-Admiral James Palmer Leahy OBE
- Captain Edward Astley-Bushton CMG RN
- Paymaster-Captain William Ernest Crocker RN
- Captain Henry Douglas King CBE DSO VD MP RN

Army

- Major-General John Macfarlane Sloan CMG DSO late Royal Medical Corps, Deputy Director of Medical Services, Southern Command, India
- Colonel Herbert Cecil Potter CMG DSO Brigade Commander, 3rd Indian Infantry Brigade, India
- Colonel Francis Adrian Wilson CMG DSO Colonel, Royal Artillery, Eastern Command
- Colonel Edward Barnard Hankey DSO Brigade Commander, 12th Infantry Brigade
- Colonel Harry Biddulph CMG DSO late Chief Engineer, Northern Command
- Colonel John Harington CMG DSO Inspector General of The King's African Rifles
- Major-General Richard Stukeley St. John DSO Indian Army, Deputy Adjutant and Quartermaster General, Northern Command, India
- Colonel Percy Langdon Beddy CMG DSO Indian Army, Brigade Commander, 6th Indian Infantry Brigade, India
- Colonel Wilfrith Gerald Key Green CMG DSO Indian Army, Brigade Commander, 1st Indian Cavalry Brigade, India

===== Civil Division =====
- Frederick Carl Bovenschen Assistant Secretary, War Office
- Frederick Phillips, Assistant Secretary, H.M. Treasury
- Eustace Beverley Shine, Assistant Secretary, Ministry of Agriculture and Fisheries
- Robert Gilbert Vansittart CMG MVO Counsellor in the Foreign Office
- Frederick Rowland Williams Wynn, Principal Clerk, Committee and Private Bill Office, House of Commons

=== Order of Merit (OM) ===
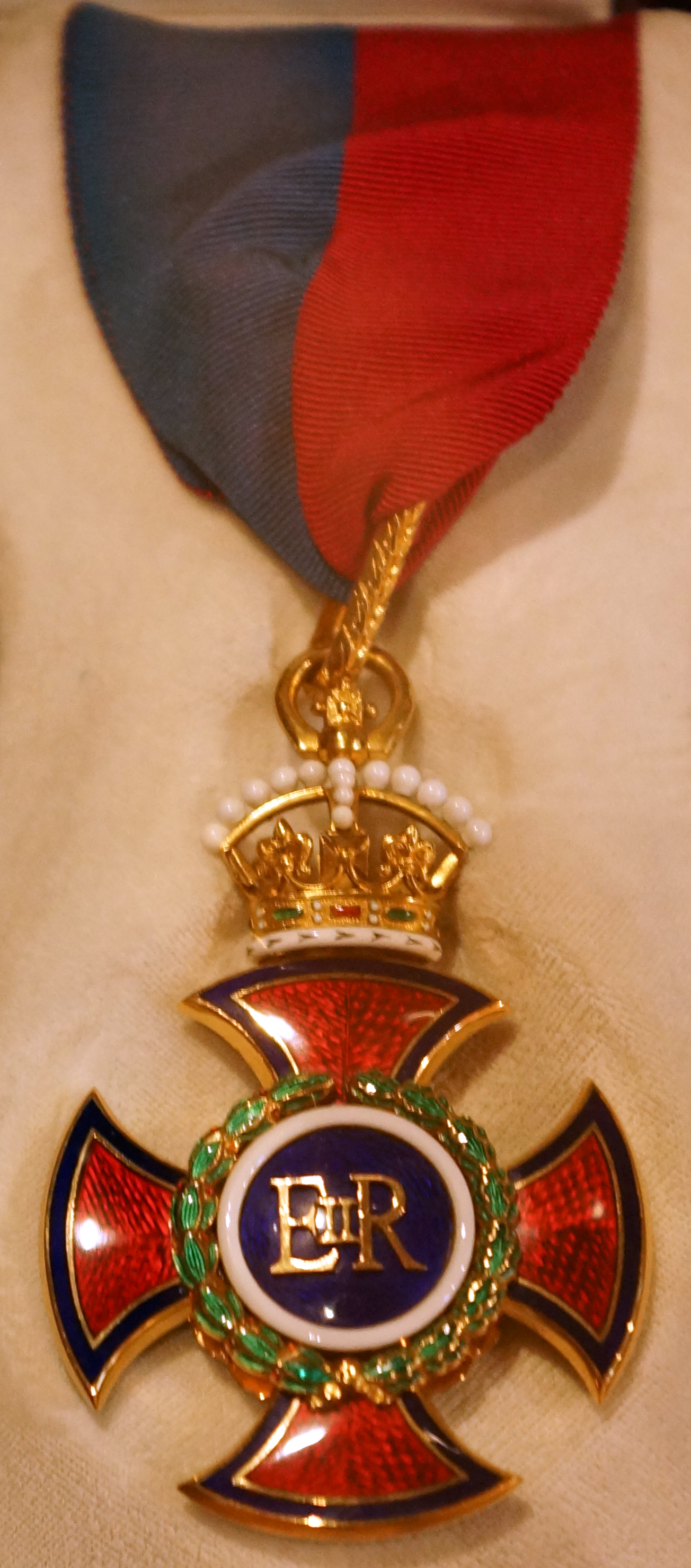
The riband and badge of the Order of Merit

- The Hon. Sir Charles Algernon Parsons KCB FRS In recognition of his eminent services in scientific research and its application to industries.

=== The Most Exalted Order of the Star of India ===
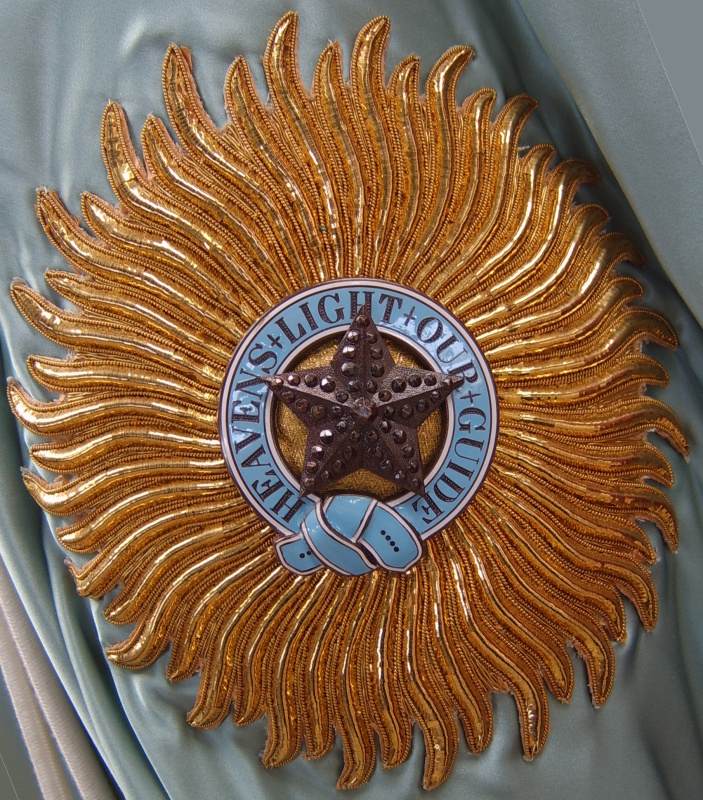
Star of a Knight Grand Commander of the Most Exalted Order of the Star of India

==== Knight Commander (KCSI) ====
- Khan Bahadur Sir Muhammad Habibullah, Sahib Bahadur KCIE Member of the Governor-General's Executive Council

==== Companion (CSI) ====
- Lieutenant-Colonel Michael Lloyd Ferrar CIE OBE Chief Commissioner, Andaman and Nicobar Islands

=== The Most Distinguished Order of Saint Michael and Saint George ===
Star of the Order of Saint Michael and Saint George

==== Knight Grand Cross of the Order of St Michael and St George (GCMG) ====
- Sir William Lamond Allardyce KCMG Governor and Commander-in-Chief of Newfoundland
- Lieutenant-General Sir Robert Stephenson Smyth Baden-Powell Bt GCVO KCB
- His Highness Charles Vyner Brooke, Rajah of Sarawak
- The Rt. Hon. Sir John Anthony Cecil Tilley KCMG CB His Majesty's Ambassador Extraordinary and Plenipotentiary at Tokyo

==== Knight Commander of the Order of St Michael and St George (KCMG) ====
- Alwin Robinson Dickinson CMG United Kingdom Member of the British Phosphate Commission
- Eric Clare Edmund Phipps CMG CVO His Majesty's Minister Plenipotentiary at Paris
- William Charles Fleming Robertson CMG Governor and Commander-in-Chief of the Island of Barbados
- Sir Herbert Nicholls Kt Lieutenant-Governor and Chief Justice of the Supreme Court, State of Tasmania

Honorary Knight Commander

- His Highness the Amir Abdullah GBE of Trans-Jordan

==== Companion of the Order of St Michael and St George (CMG) ====
- John Fitzgerald Brenan, Acting British Consul-General at Canton
- Alan Cuthbert Burns, Colonial Secretary, Bahama Islands
- Henry Grattan Bushe, Assistant Legal Adviser, Colonial Office
- Professor Robert William Chapman, of the University of Adelaide, President of the Astronomical Society and of other institutions in the State of South Australia
- Joseph Robert Cahill, Commercial Counsellor at His Majesty's Embassy at Paris
- John Thomas Collins KC Parliamentary Draughtsman, State of Victoria
- Captain Gilbert Joseph Cullen Dyett, Federal President of the Returned Sailors and Soldiers Imperial League of Australia
- George Lewis Hollingsworth Hughes. Chief Inspector of Parquet; Egyptian Ministry of Justice
- Major John Morton Fremantle MBE DCM Senior Resident, Nigeria
- Harold Alfred MacMichael DSO Civil Secretary, Sudan Government
- The Hon. Howard Unwin Moffat, Minister of Mines and Public Works, Southern Rhodesia
- Owen St. Clair O'Malley, Acting Counsellor at His Majesty's legation at Peking
- Edward Hugh Dyneley Nicolls OBE AMICE Director of Public Works, Gold Coast Colony
- Wilfrid Thomas Southorn, Colonial Secretary, Hong Kong
- John Christian Ramsay Sturrock, Resident Commissioner, Basutoland
- Eric Teichman CIE Chinese Counsellor at His Majesty's Legation at Peking
- Robert Neimann Thaine, Government Agent, Western Province, Ceylon
- Henry Wagstaffe Thomson, British Resident, Perak, Federated Malay States
- Arthur Francis Holme Wiggin, First Secretary at His Majesty's Residency at Cairo
- Charles John FitzRoy Rhys Wingfield, Counsellor at His Majesty's Embassy at Rome

=== The Most Eminent Order of the Indian Empire ===
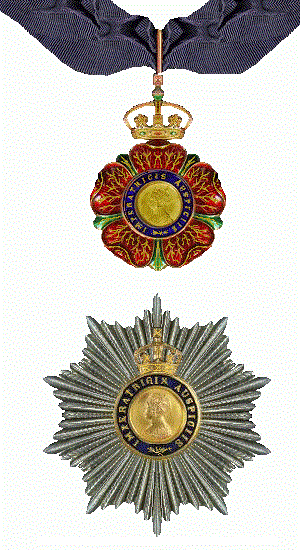
Riband, badge and star of the Knight Grand Commander of the Order of the Indian Empire

==== Knight Commander (KCIE) ====
- Frederick William Johnston CSI CIE Indian Civil Service, Agent to the Governor-General and Chief Commissioner, Baluchistan
- Cowasji Jehangir CIE OBE Member of the Executive Council, Bombay

==== Companion (CIE) ====
- John Hugh Ronald Fraser OBE Indian Civil Service, Judicial Commissioner, North-West Frontier Province
- Lieutenant-Colonel John Cyril Holdich Leicester, Indian Medical Service, lately Officiating Surgeon-General to the Government of Bengal
- Charles William Charteris Carson OBE Controller, Civil Accounts, India
- Jnanendra Nath Gupta MBE Indian Civil Service, Commissioner, Presidency Division, Bengal
- Geoffrey Ewart Soames, Indian Civil Service, Chief Secretary to the Government of Assam
- Henry Crawford Liddell, Indian Civil Service, Superintendent and Remembrancer of Legal Affairs, and Judicial Secretary to the Government of Bengal
- Arthur George Edie, Chief Conservator of Forests, Bombay
- Joseph Benjamin George Smith, Officiating Chief Engineer, Public Works Department, Irrigation Branch, Punjab
- Digby Livingstone Drake-Brockman, Indian Civil Service, Revenue Member, State Council, Jodhpur, Rajputana
- David Macfarlane Stewart, Indian Civil Service, Provincial Training Officer, Moradabad, United Provinces
- Richard'Littlehailes, Director of Public Instruction, Madras
- John Alfred Baker, Chief Engineer, Public Works Department (Buildings and Roads), Central Provinces
- Lieutenant-Colonel Roderick William Macdonald DSO Indian Army, Inspector-General of Police, Burma
- Charles Stanley Whitworth, Chief Mining Engineer to Railway Board, Bengal
- Arthur Beecham Briggs, Superintending Engineer, United Provinces
- Lieutenant-Colonel Leopold d'Estreville Lenfestey, Indian Army Ordnance Corps, Superintendent, Rifle Factory, Ishapore, Bengal
- John Elliot Armstrong OBE lately Deputy Inspector-General of Police, Bengal, and now Director-General of Police, His Exalted Highness The Nizam's Government, Hyderabad (Deccan). Reginald John Hirst, Deputy Inspector-General of Police, Bihar and Orissa
- Frank Priestly Vincent Gompertz, Director of Revenue Survey, Madras
- Major Alfred Geddes Tresidder, Indian Medical Service, Surgeon to His Excellency the Governor of Bombay
- Captain (temporary Major) Arthur Friedrich Rawson Lumby OBE Indian Army, General Staff Officer, 2nd Grade, Army Headquarters, lately Secretary to the Indian Sandhurst Committee
- Percy Lancelot Orde, Senior Superintendent of Police, Delhi
- Bad Bahadur Janak Singh, Bahadur, Major-General in the Kashmir State Forces, Revenue Member of the Executive Council and Army Minister, Jammu and Kashmir State
- Diwan Bahadur Thakorram Kapilram, Mehta, Government Pleader and Chairman, Committee of Management, Surat, Bombay Presidency

=== Imperial Order of the Crown of India ===
- Pamela, Countess of Lytton

=== The Royal Victorian Order ===
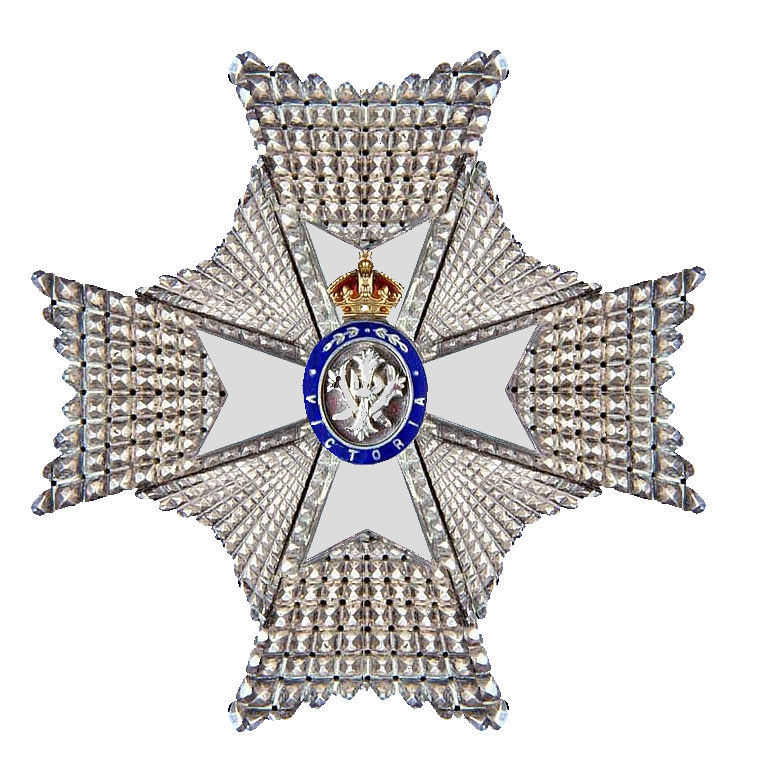
Insignia of a Knight / Dames Commander of the Royal Victorian Order

==== Knight Grand Cross of the Royal Victorian Order (GCVO) ====
- The Rt. Hon. Edward Arthur, Baron Colebrooke
- The Rt. Hon. Amelius Richard Mark, Baron Lambourne CVO

==== Knight Commander of the Royal Victorian Order (KCVO) ====
- George Francis Hugh, Earl of Eltham
- Sir Francis Bernard Dicksee PRA
- Harry Lloyd-Verney CVO
- Edward Farquhar Buzzard

==== Commander of the Royal Victorian Order (CVO) ====
- Brigadier-General Montagu Grant Wilkinson CB CMG MVO (dated 28 March 1927)
- Colonel Wilford Neville Lloyd CB MVO
- Brigadier-General John Cecil Wray CB CMG MVO
- Lieutenant-Colonel Henry Walter George Cole CSI OBE
- Henry Linnington Martyn MVO FRCS

==== Member of the Royal Victorian Order, 4th class (MVO) ====
- Major Charles Alfred Lowry Howard DSO MC
- Lieutenant-Colonel Frederick Edward Packe OBE
- Colonel Edward George Keppel
- Donald Alexander Matheson

==== Member of the Royal Victorian Order, 5th class (MVO) ====
- Herbert Ryle OBE
- Thomas Hay
- David Robert
- Craig Tennant FRCVS

=== The Most Excellent Order of the British Empire ===
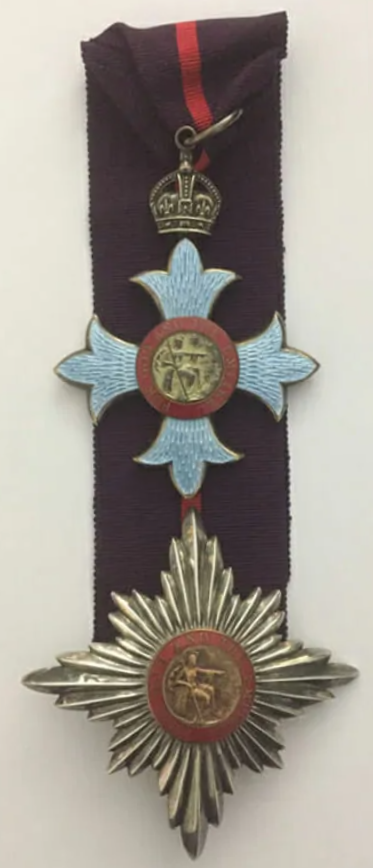
Knight Commander of the Order of the British Empire, insignia 1917–35

==== Dame Grand Cross of the Order of the British Empire (GBE) ====
- Her Royal Highness Princess Victoria Alexandra Alice Mary, Viscountess Lascelles
- Dame Nellie Melba DBE recognition of services to the Commonwealth of Australia

==== Knight Grand Cross of the Order of the British Empire (GBE) ====
===== Civil Division =====
- Sir Henry Frank Heath KCB late Secretary to the Department of Scientific and Industrial Research
- Lieutenant-Colonel the Rt. Hon. Sir Samuel John Gurney-Hoare Bt CMG MP
- Sir Otto Ernst Niemeyer KCB Controller of Finance, H.M. Treasury
- Sir Richard Threlfall KBE FRS FCS For public services.
- The Right Honourable Edward Hilton Young DSO DSC MP Chairman of the Royal Commission on Indian Currency

British India

- Sir Henry Strakosch KBE lately Member of the Royal Commission on Indian Currency

==== Dame Commander of the Order of the British Empire (DBE) ====
- Emily Penrose OBE late Principal of Somerville College, Oxford
- Helena Violet Alice, Countess of Stradbroke OBE recognition of services rendered during her husband's Governorship of the State of Victoria, 1921–26
- Edith Marion, Lady Antrobus, Honorary Secretary of the Overseas Nursing Association

==== Knight Commander of the Order of the British Empire (KBE) ====
===== Military Division =====
Royal Navy

- Vice-Admiral Brian Herbert Fairbairn Barttelot CB MVO (retired)

Army

- Major-General Herbert Fothergill Cooke CB CSI CBE DSO Indian Army, General Officer Commanding, Sind-Rajputana District, India
- Major-General Archibald Buchanan Ritchie CB CMG British Service, General Officer Commanding, 51st (The Highland) Division, Territorial Army, Scottish Command
- Lieutenant-Colonel Charlton Watson Spinks DSO OBE Regular Army Reserve of Officers, Royal Artillery, Inspector General, Egyptian Army

===== Civil Division =====
- Cyril Ernest Ashford CB MVO Headmaster of the Royal Naval College, Dartmouth
- Lieutenant-Colonel George William Humphreys CBE MInstCE Chief Engineer to the London County Council
- Charles Haughton Rafter CBE Chief Constable of Birmingham
- Colonel Herbert Stuart Sankey CVO VD JP DL late Remembrancer of the City of London
- Kenneth Dugald Stewart, Delegate to the Special China Tariff Conference at Peking
- Ernest John Strohmenger CB Accountant General, Ministry of Health
- Lieutenant-Colonel Francis Dudley Williams-Drummond CBE JP DL For public and political services in Carmarthenshire.
- Colonel Murrough John Wilson MP Member of Parliament for Richmond Division of Yorkshire since December 1918. Chairman of the Navy, Army and Air Force Institutes

British India

- Geoffrey Latham Corbett CIE Indian Civil Service, Secretary to the Government of India in the Commerce Department

Diplomatic Service and Overseas List

- John Joyce Broderick CMG Commercial Counsellor at His Majesty's Embassy, Washington
- Captain Edward Colpoys Midwinter CB CMG CBE DSO Controller, Sudan Government, London Office
- John Hope Percival, Judicial Adviser to the Egyptian Government

Dominions

- Charles Percy Barlee Clubbe In recognition of services to the Commonwealth of Australia.
- William Smith Crawford, Member of the Empire Marketing Board and Vice-Chairman of the Publicity Committee of the Board
- Sir Godfrey Yeatman Lagden KCMG in recognition of public services.
- Charles Graham Waddell, in recognition of services to the Commonwealth of Australia

Colonies, Protectorates, etc

- Major John Alder Burdon CMG Governor and Commander-in-Chief of the Colony of British Honduras
- Nana Ofori Atta CBE Omanhene of Akim Abuakwa, Provincial Member of the Legislative Council, Gold Coast Colony
- Edward Brandis Denham CMG Colonial Secretary, Kenya Colony
- Hayes Marriott CMG Colonial Secretary, Straits Settlements

==== Commander of the Order of the British Empire (CBE) ====
===== Military Division =====
Royal Navy

- Captain Sidney Robert Bailey DSO
- Surgeon-Captain Alfred James Hewitt
- Commander Alexander Grant DSC (retired)
- Engineer Captain Ernest Dickerson Sydenham, Director of Engineering, Royal Australian Navy

Army

- Captain Leslie William Alexander, Regular Army Reserve of Officers, 1st King's Dragoon Guards, and local Lieutenant-Colonel Commanding lst/2nd Cavalry Regiment, Iraq Levies
- Colonel Henry Edwin Boxshall, Staff for Royal Engineer Services, Chief Inspector of Works, War Office
- Lieutenant-Colonel and Brevet Colonel Ian Maxwell Campbell TD 8th (The Argyllshire) Battalion, The Argyll and Sutherland Highlanders (Princess Louise's), Territorial Army
- Lieutenant-Colonel Horace Akroyd Case CMG DSO Retired Pay, Regular Army Reserve of Officers, The Dorsetshire Regiment; Lieutenant-Colonel Commanding 6th (Tanganyika Territory) Battalion, The King's African Rifles, and Officer Commanding, Troops, Tanganyika Territory
- Ordnance Mechanical Engineer, 1st Class and Colonel Percy George Davies CMG MIMechE Royal Army Ordnance Corps, Assistant Director of Equipment and Ordnance Stores, Quartermaster-General's Department, War Office
- Colonel William Bruce Dunlop DSO OBE Indian Army, Director of Contracts, Master General of Supply Branch, Army Headquarters, India
- The Reverend Joseph David Samuel Parry-Evans CMG KHC Chaplain to the Forces, 1st Class Assistant Chaplain-General, Aldershot Command
- Colonel Alan James Gordon Moir DSO British Service, Deputy-Adjutant and Quartermaster-General, Headquarters, Western Command, India

Royal Air Force

- Joanna Margaret Cruickshank RRC Matron-in-Chief, Princess Mary's Royal Air Force Nursing Service
- Group Captain Richard Williams DSO OBE Royal Australian Air Force, in recognition of distinguished services rendered on the recent seaplane flight from Melbourne to the British Solomon Islands and back

===== Civil Division =====
- Major Philip Francis Ross Anley, Chief Constable of Derbyshire
- Percy Ashfield DL For political and public services in Flintshire
- Alexander Blair Chief Valuer for Scotland, Board of Inland Revenue
- The Reverend Thomas Burns TD JP FRSE Chairman of Newington House, Scottish Institution for Scottish Blinded Soldiers and Sailors
- Albert Edward Carlyle. For public services.
- Robert Francis Cholmeley OBE lately Headmaster of Owen's School, Islington
- George Frederick Clucas, Speaker of the House of Keys, Isle of Man
- Colonel Jacynth D'Ewes FitzErcald Coke CMG CVO Chief Constable of the West Riding of Yorkshire
- Stanley Lewis Duff, Chairman of the Approved Societies Consultative Council
- Alfred John Harding OBE Assistant Secretary, Colonial Office
- Charles Joseph William Harris, Private Secretary to the Parliamentary Secretary to H.M. Treasury
- Major George Arthur Harris DSO OBE TD Permanent Secretary, Ministry of Home Affairs, Northern Ireland
- Wilfrid Appleby Gales. For political services.
- Edward Goldie Howarth, Director of Establishments, Board of Education
- John Jeffrey, Secretary, Scottish Board of Health
- Norman Kendal, Deputy Assistant Commissioner, Metropolitan Police
- Colonel Frederick Joseph Lemon DSO Chief Constable of Nottinghamshire
- Thomas Frederick Lister, Chairman of the British Legion
- George William Buckham McLeod, Statistical Officer, Ministry of Health
- George Monro MBE Commandant, Metropolitan Special Constabulary
- George Frederick Plant, Secretary to the Oversea Settlement Committee
- Alfred Theodore Vaughan Robinson, Controller of Cost Accounts, War Office
- John Rogers OBE Deputy Director of Dockyards
- Ernest William Rowntree, Assistant Secretary, Ministry of Transport
- Lieutenant-Colonel Norman Gibb Scorgie OBE Deputy Controller of H.M. Stationery Office
- James Molony Spaight OBE Assistant Secretary, Air Ministry
- Henry Sparkes OBE Controller of Stores, General Post Office
- Edwin Earle Stonham OBE Collector, Board of Customs and Excise
- John William Todd FAA Deputy Accountant General, Ministry of Labour
- Sidney Turner FIA Accountant General, India Office
- William Reeve Wallace OBE Chief Clerk, Judicial Committee of the Privy Council
- John Henderson Watson OBE Chief Constable of Bristol

British India

- Raj Bahadur Shyam Narayan Singh OBE Member of the Legislative Assembly
- Lieutenant-Colonel Edward O'Brien, Resident at Kolhapoir and Political Agent, Southern Mahratta Country States, Bombay
- Major Arthur Edward Broadbent Parsons DSO OBE Deputy Secretary to the Government of India in the Foreign and Political Department
- Lieutenant-Colonel John Mackenzie CIE Military Secretary to His Excellency the Governor of Bengal
- Gustav Weber Thompson, Chief Sanitary Officer to the Jharia Mines Board of Health, Bihar and Orissa

Diplomatic Service and Overseas List

- Nigel George Davidson, Legal Secretary, Sudan Government
- Charles Vernon Dicken, Director of Finance of the Tangier Zone
- George Herbert Griffith OBE Deputy General Manager, Egyptian State Railways
- James Alexander Jameson Fields, Manager of Anglo-Persian Oil Company
- Reginald Charles Fulke Maughadm, Senior Consul
- Albert Martin Oppenheimer, Legal Adviser to His Majesty's Embassy, Berlin
- Arthur Claude Parker MBE General Manager, Sudan Government Railways and Steamers
- Vivian Lee Osborne Sheppard, Surveyor-General, Survey of Egypt

Dominions

- The Reverend John Walter Bethune Headmaster of the Church Grammar School Launceston, State of Tasmania
- Lieutenant-Colonel Rowland Mortimer Daniel, Assistant Resident Commissioner, Bechuanaland Protectorate
- Daniel James Davies, Government Analyst, Department of Public Works, Newfoundland
- James Thomas Heathershaw, Secretary to the Treasury, Commonwealth of Australia
- Thomas William King, General Manager, Haymarket Stores; in recognition of services in connection with the marketing of Empire produce.
- George Jerningham Little, Private Secretary to the Governor-General of the Dominion of New Zealand
- Neil Morrison Macfarlane CM Principal Medical Officer, Basutoland

Colonies, Protectorates, etc

- Major Albert Abramson OBE District Commissioner, Northern District, Palestine
- Harold Thomas Creasy MICE Director of Public Works, Hong Kong
- Charles Kenneth Dain, Treasurer and Controller of the Savings Bank, Uganda
- Lieutenant-Colonel Albert Ernest Gallagher DSO Chief Commandant of Police and Inspector of Prisons, Cyprus
- William Marshall Philip CM lately Medical Officer of Health, Colombo Municipal Council, Ceylon
- John Powter, Director of Government Railways, Jamaica
- Song Ong Siang, Unofficial Member of the Legislative Council of the Straits Settlements
- Arthur Lionel Forster Smith MVO Inspector General of Education, Iraq
- George Moody Stuart, for services in connection with the Imperial College of Tropical Agriculture
- Edward Samuel Bourn Tagart, Secretary for Native Affairs, Northern Rhodesia
- Howard Mark Woolley, lately Postmaster General, Nigeria
- Charles Rufus Marshall Workman, Colonial Secretary, Gambia

==== Officer of the Order of the British Empire (OBE) ====
===== Military Division =====
Royal Navy

- Commander Ernie William Money
- Commander Thomas Parkinson, (retired)
- Engineer-Commander John Wisdom
- Surgeon-Commander Guy Leslie Buckeridge
- Paymaster Lieutenant Frederick Robert Joseph Mack
- Commander Ernest Edkin RD RNR

Army

- Major Alan Sauer Auret, 3rd Battalion, 10th Baluch Regiment (Queen Mary's Own), Indian Army
- Quartermaster and Captain Roderick Bailhe MBE Royal Artillery
- Captain Richard George Forfeitt Beale, 6th Battalion, The Devonshire Regiment, Territorial Army
- Lieutenant-Colonel Walter Strickland Beamish, Royal Artillery, Assistant Director of Equipment and Ordnance Stores, Army Headquarters, India
- Matron Maud Mary Blakely RRC Queen Alexandra's Imperial Military Nursing Service
- Major Gustavus Glyn Spieker Brander, The Suffolk Regiment, late attached Sudan Defence Force
- Captain John Cabel Bray, 46th (North Midland) Divisional Signals, Royal Corps of Signals, Territorial Army
- Major Noel Gordon Monad Browne, Staff Officer, Department of the Adjutant General of the Australian Military Forces
- Quartermaster and Major Ernest George Butler MC Retired Pay, County Recruiting Officer, Newcastle-on-Tyne
- Major Iltyd Nicholl Clayton, Royal Artillery, Chief Instructor and Staff Officer, Artillery, Iraq Army
- Lieutenant-Colonel Walter Cooper MC 63rd (6th London) Field Brigade, Royal Artillery, Territorial Army
- Captain Reginald Charles Cummings, 43rd (Wessex) Divisional Signals, Royal Corps of Signals, Territorial Army
- The Reverend Henry Peverley-Dodd, Chaplain to the Forces, Senior Wesleyan Chaplain, Aldershot Command
- Captain Noel Walter Eastwood, 3rd The King's Own Hussars, attached Sudan Defence Force
- Major Charles Morgan Finny FRCS Royal Army Medical Corps
- Captain and Brevet Major William Alexander Lovat-Fraser, 4th (Prince of Wales's Own) Battalion, 8th Punjab Regiment, Indian Army, Brigade Major, Military Forces, Iraq
- Captain Alfred Joseph Gatt MC Royal Malta Artillery
- Staff Paymaster and Major Harry Golding, Royal Army Pay Corps
- Major Vernon Robert Guise MC Royal Artillery, lately attached Iraq Levies
- Captain Herle Maudslay Hordern MC Royal Artillery
- Captain Eric Harold Howe, Indian Army Remount Department, District Remount Officer, Montgomery Area, India
- Captain Stanley Woodburn Kirby MC Royal Engineers
- Lieutenant-Colonel Robert Godfrey Llewellyn MC 53rd (Welsh) Divisional Signals, Royal Corps of Signals, Territorial Army
- Major Alan Joseph McCarraher, Postal Section, Royal Engineers, Supplementary Reserve
- Captain James Eben McConnell, The Seaforth Highlanders (Rossshire Buffs, The Duke of Albany's)
- Major Eric Debonnair Theophilus Metcalfe MC Indian Army Service Corps, Deputy Assistant Director, Mechanical Transport, Army Headquarters, India
- Captain William Edward Cuming Moore, Royal Army Ordnance Corps
- Major and Brevet Lieutenant-Colonel John Hugh Morris DSO Royal Army Service Corps
- Lieutenant-Colonel Leonard Lachlan Porter VD The Nilgiri Malabar Battalion, Auxiliary Force, India
- Lieutenant James Malcolm Leslie Renton MBE The Rifle Brigade (Prince Consort's Own), lately serving with the local rank of major, as Deputy Assistant Adjutant-General, Iraq Levies
- Major Robert Noel Girling Scott, 4th Battalion, 15th Punjab Regiment, Indian Army; Officer-in-Charge Intelligence Bureau, Baluchistan District, India
- Quartermaster and Major Herbert Simpson MBE MC Extra Regimentally Employed List, Private Secretary to the Adjutant General, War Office
- Major John Heatley Spencer Royal Army Medical Corps
- Captain George Alexander Neville Swiney MC Royal Army Ordnance Corps, Adjutant, Depot, Royal Army Ordnance Corps
- Quartermaster and Lieutenant-Colonel Gwynne Cecil Thomas DSO Extra Regimentally Employed List, Quartermaster and Adjutant, The Duke of York's Royal Military School
- Quartermaster and Captain Thomas George Upton DCM 11th Hussars (Prince Albert's Own)
- Major John Raymond Warren MC TD 4th Battalion, The Royal Sussex Regiment
- Territorial Army
- Captain Alfred Edward Williams, 1st Battalion, The Great Indian Peninsular Railway Regiment, Auxiliary Force, India
- Captain Harold Williamson FRCS Indian Medical Service
- Lieutenant-Colonel Hugh Wilson, 55th (Northumbrian) Medium Brigade, Royal Artillery, Territorial Army

Royal Air Force

- Squadron Leader Arthur Travers Harris AFC
- Squadron Leader Arthur Trafalgar Williams
- Squadron Leader William Boston Cushion

===== Civil Division =====
- James William Allen For services to the Prize Court Registry
- Franklyn Leslie Barnard AFC Pilot under Imperial Airways Ltd
- Henry Cecil Boys MBE Assistant Superintendent of Design Royal Arsenal, Woolwich
- Oswald Edward Beecher Brigden, M District Auditor, Ministry of Health
- Elizabeth Miriam Burgwin, For services to Education
- James Thomas Burns, Chief Officer of the Birkenhead Fire Brigade
- Major Frederick Lawrence Stanley Clarke, Chief Constable of Gloucestershire
- James Cook, Principal, Board of Customs and Excise
- William Walter Coombs MBE Chief Clerk, Companies Department, Board of Trade
- George Frederick Cotton MVO MBE Principal Admiralty
- Henry Albert Cox, Education Officer, Air Ministry
- John Crompton. For service to textile education.
- Charles Francis Wolley-Dod, Pilot under Imperial Airways Ltd.
- Henry Richard Evans, For public services.
- William Anthony Faux, Chairman of the Salford Local Employment Committee
- Walter Ernest Ferguson. Senior Inspector, Board of Inland Revenue
- Macleod Barker Frere, Clerk of Accounts, Metropolitan Police Office
- Henry William-Garrett, Principal, India Office
- James Stanley Pool Godsell MBE Principal, Ministry of Transport
- William Gordon, Chief Constable of Dumfriesshire
- Richard John Halford MBE Chief Superintendent, City of London Police
- Major Bernard Charles Hartley, Secretary of the Army Sports Central Board
- Alfred Hawkins, For public services.
- Joseph Cornelius Holmes, For public services.
- Herbert John Hutchinson, Principal, Board of Trade
- Robert Jackson, Secretary to the British Trawlers Federation
- Thomas Johnson, H.M. Inspector of Elementary Schools
- Ernest Livingstone Johnston AFC Assistant Royal Airship Works, Cardington
- Lieutenant-Colonel Albert George Lee MC MIEE Staff Engineer, General Post Office
- Sydney Walter-Herbert Long. For public services.
- John James Moynihan, Divisional Inspector, Ministry of Health
- Eliza Grace Musgrove, Matron of the Devon County Mental Hospital
- Frank Pacy, City Librarian of Westminster, Secretary of the Library Association
- William Dawson Paterson, Assistant Chief Constable, Edinburgh City Police Force
- Major Rupert Ernest Penny, Principal Technical Officer, Air Ministry
- Thomas Joseph Pey, Chief Constable of Wigan
- James Pimlott, Chief Inspector, Ministry of Agriculture, Northern Ireland
- Frank Popplewell, Secretary of Trade Boards, Ministry of Labour
- Victor Edward Pullin Director of Radiological Research, War Office
- Francis William Purssell MBE Commandant, Metropolitan Special Constabulary, Reserve
- William McCulloch Ramsay DL For services to Education in Edinburgh
- Nicholas Serge Reyntiens, Assistant Director, Department of Overseas Trade
- Lawrence Richmond, Clerk to the Sheffield Board of Guardians
- Hugh Roberts, Member of the Carnarvon Insurance Committee
- Elizabeth Sanday, Woman Superintendent, Accountant General's Department, General Post Office
- Richard Jefferson Simpson, Principal, Ministry of Health
- Frederick Harry Stafford, Secretary of the Worcester Training Ship
- Ethel Steel Lady Principal, Royal School for Officers Daughters, Bath
- Leo Taylor, Chief Commoner of the Corporation of the City of London
- Henry Vincent Victor Thompson, Principal, Ministry of Finance, Northern Ireland
- Edward Trotter For public services.
- Philip Corbett Turnbull, Commander, Metropolitan Special Constabulary
- Alexander Turner, For public services.
- George Herbert Valentine MBE Divisional Commander, City of London Special Constabulary
- John Waller MBE Assistant Chief Constable of Durham
- Robert William Wharhirst, Superintendent of Armament Supply, Admiralty
- Arthur Stuart Williams, Chief Constable of Sussex West

In recognition of the conspicuous ability and courage displayed by the under-mentioned Officers of the S.S. Sunning in recovering their vessel which had been captured by pirates off the coast of China on 15 November 1926 —

- Thomas Parke Beatty, Chief Officer
- Joseph William Hurst, Second Officer

British India

- Thomas Forster Main, Deputy Director of Agriculture, Bombay
- Hasan Suhrawardy, Major, Indian Territorial Force Medical Corps, Medical Practitioner, Bengal
- Cecil Douglas Rae, Presidency Postmaster, Calcutta
- Commander William Lamb Kelly RNR (retired), Personal Assistant to the Presidency Port Officer, and Agent for Government Consignments, Madras
- Captain Mahomed Fazal-ud-Din, Indian Medical Service, Agency Surgeon at Jandola, South Waziristan
- John Slattery, Assistant Inspector-General, Government Railway Police, Punjab
- Herbert James Mitchell, Burma Frontier Service
- Albin Richard Rebello, Assistant Accountant General, Punjab
- Richard Wybrants Coryton, Superintendent, Governor's Estates, Bengal
- Frank Ludlow, lately Head Master, Tibetan School, Gyantse
- Sardar Bahadur Jiwan Singh, Honorary Magistrate, Padhana District, Lahore
- The Reverend Thomas Watson Gardiner, Principal of the Hislop College, Nagpur, and Chairman of the Nagpur Mission Council of the United Free Church of Scotland
- Khan Bahadur Qaai Khalil-ud-Din Ahmad, Dewan, Bijawar State, Bundelkhand, Central India

Diplomatic Service and Overseas List

- Robert Vickers Bardsley MBE Deputy Governor, Blue Nile Province
- Laurence Bolton, Chief Town Surveyor, Khartoum
- Geoffrey Bramall, District Traffic Manager of Sudan Government Railways
- Henry William Burnett MBE Vice-Consul at Maldonado
- William Peter Dunham Clarke, Assistant Financial Secretary (Second), Sudan Government
- George Norman Croker MC Deputy Chief Engineer, Sudan irrigation Department
- George Walter Grabham, Government Geologist, Khartoum
- Cedric Vincent Wild Grose, Head Master, English School, Cairo
- The Reverend Wilfred Langton Kissack late Consul for Surinam and French Guiana
- Edmund Lloyd MBE Church Missionary Society, Sudan
- Walter Randolph Lucas Bey DSO Governor of Tura Prison, Egyptian Government
- Austin William Medley, British Expert to Japanese Ministry for Foreign Affairs
- Major John James Munro, Deputy Inspector-General of Telegraphs, Egyptian Government
- Alwyne George Neville Ogden, Acting Consul at Kiukiang
- Robert Parr, British Vice-Consul at Damascus
- Charles Henry Saxby, of Messrs. Lawrence and Mayo, Opticians, Cairo
- Macduff Frederick Simpson, Controller of Secondary Education, Egyptian Government
- William Percy Whitford Turner, Acting Consul and Legation Accountant at Peking

Dominions

- Frederick Hugh Dutton, Director of Education, Basutoland
- Alice Mabel Maud Emmerton, of Melbourne, in recognition of charitable and social services in the State of Victoria

Colonies, Protectorates, etc.

- Harold Bruce Gardiner Austin, Member of the House of Assembly and President of the Education Board, Barbados, represented Barbados at the West Indies Conference
- Arthur William Bluck, Assistant Judge of the Supreme Court, Member of the House of Assembly, Bermuda
- Katherme Hyde Bourne, in recognition of her public and social services in Jamaica
- Thomas Gordon Buckley, District Officer, Tanganyika Territory
- Attilio Critien MBE Chief Government Medical Officer and Superintendent of Public Health, Malta
- Robert Edward Harold Crosbie, Assistant District Commissioner, Southern District, Palestine
- Dimitrios Nicholas Dimitriou, Member of the Executive Council of Cyprus, and President of the Municipal Council of Larnaca
- Charlotte Elizabeth Ferguson-Davie recognition of her services in the Straits Settlements
- Thomas Fitzgerald, Postmaster General, Kenya Colony
- Richard Wolfe Gordon, District Officer, Tanganyika Territory
- Daniel Meinerts Hahn MICE Assistant Director of Public Works, Trinidad
- Bertram Evelyn Hanson, lately Auditor, Nigeria
- Walter Frederick Hedges ARIBA Chief Architect, Public Works Department, Gold Coast Colony
- John Bruce Howell, Manager of the Government Savings Bank, Barbados
- Seymour Wylde Howes, Unofficial Member.of the Executive Council, Montserrat, in recognition of his services to the Government of Montserrat
- William Joseph Johnson, Deputy Treasurer, Palestine
- E'udblf Franz Mayer, Chief Proprietor of The East African Standard, in recognition of his services to Kenya Colony
- Edward Ebbert Mifsud MBE Private Secretary to the Governor of Malta and Clerk of the Executive Council, Nominated Council and Privy Council of the Island
- John Randall Phillips Senior Member of the Legislative Council of Barbados
- John Prichard, President of the Court of First Instance, Baghdad, Iraq
- Edward Keith Roach, Deputy District, Commissioner Jerusalem District, Palestine
- George Freeman Royds, Director-General, Tapu Department, Iraq
- Joseph Mario Smith, Chief Veterinary Officer, Palestine
- Ho Kom-tong, for public and charitable services in the Colony of Hong Kong
- John Frederick Wilkins, Deputy Inspector General of Police, Iraq
- Herbert Pinckney Winslow, Manager of the British Section of the Kowloon-Canton Railway, Hong Kong
- Haji Hafiz Mehmed Ziauddin, the Mufti of Cyprus

==== Member of the Order of the British Empire (MBE) ====
===== Military Division =====
Royal Navy

- Ordnance-Lieutenant Alexander Humphrey Workman
- Lieutenant Samuel George Davis
- Engineer-Lieutenant Percy Robert Brooker
- Paymaster-Lieutenant Arthur George Webley
- Headmaster Arthur William Holland
- Lieutenant William Edward Petley RM

Army

- Regimental Quartermaster Sergeant Albert Aston, Grenadier Guards
- Sergeant Major Artillery Clerk Alfred Ernest Ball, Royal Artillery
- Lieutenant George Francis Bancroft, Royal Army Ordnance Corps
- Warrant Officer Class I Bandmaster William Bartlett, 2nd Battalion, The Gordon Highlanders
- Quartermaster and Lieutenant William George Laurence Beattie, The Argyll and Sutherland Highlanders (Princess Louise's)
- Regimental Sergeant-Major Joseph Bradburn, Royal Army Service Corps
- Staff Sergeant-Major Walter John Brooks DCM Royal Army Service Corps
- Assistant Commissary and Lieutenant John Bryce, Indian Miscellaneous List, Superintendent, Headquarters, Western Command, India
- Lieutenant John Leitch Charman, Army Educational Corps
- Conductor Harry Alfred Clarke, Indian Army Service Corps
- Regimental Sergeant-Major Reginald William Cole, Royal Army Medical Corps
- Quartermaster and Captain James Connor, Royal Army Service Corps
- Assistant Commissary and Lieutenant Albert Cook, Indian Army Ordnance Corps
- Lieutenant William Harry Noel Dent, Royal Corps of Signals, Iraq Signal Section
- Superintending Clerk Edward James Drumm, Royal Engineers
- Company Sergeant-Major John Ferguson, The Gordon, Highlanders, attached Sudan Defence Force
- First Class Staff Sergeant-Major Archibald William Flood, Ebyal Army Service Corps
- Lieutenant James Stead Garrett, 4th (Prince of Wales's Own) Battalion, 8th Punjab Regiment, Indian Army
- Lieutenant Walter Bramwell Valder Henry Paul Gates, Royal Army Service Corps
- Sister Winifred Mary Gedye ARRC Queen Alexandra's Imperial Military Nursing Service
- Quartermaster and Captain George Giddens, 8th (Isle of Wight Rifles, Princess
- Beatrice's) Battalion, The Hampshire Regiment, Territorial Army
- Quartermaster and Lieutenant Albert Gill, 2nd Battalion, The South Staffordshire Regiment
- Sub Assistant Surgeon Subadar Gurditt Singh, Indian Medical Department
- First Class Staff Sergeant-Major William Joseph Hart, Royal Army Service Corps
- Quartermaster Sergeant Instructor Ernest Humphries, Gunnery School, Royal Tank Corps
- Conductor Saville Britain Jackson, Indian Miscellaneous List, Superintendent, Adjutant General's Branch, Army Headquarters, India
- Conductor Thomas Morland Johnson, Indian Army Ordnance Corps
- Regimental Sergeant-Major Alexander John Keen, Army Physical Training Staff, Army School of Physical Training, Ambala, India
- Company Sergeant-Major Joseph Robert Kilgour DCM 5th Battalion, The Durham Light Infantry, Territorial Army
- Staff Sergeant-Major Percy George Lomax, Royal Army Service Corps
- Captain John Alexander Longmore, 1st Battalion, The Hertfordshire Regiment, Territorial Army
- Company Sergeant-Major Alpiri Macgregor, The Gordon Highlanders, lately local Regimental Sergeant-Major, Iraq Levies
- Captain Cuthbert David Marley, 5th Battalion, The Durham Light Infantry, Territorial Army Deputy, Commissary and Captain Percy
- Harold Marshall, Indian Miscellaneous List, Superintendent General Staff Branch, Army Headquarters, India
- Veterinary Assistant Surgeon Noor Mohamed, 2nd Cavalry Regiment;, Iraq Levies
- Lieutenant Ernest Vincent Packer, Regular Army Reserve of Officers, The Essex Regiment, lately serving with the local rank of captain, as Adjutant, 1st Battalion, Iraq Levies, and now attached Iraq Army
- Quartermaster and Lieutenant Arthur Pugh MC 2nd Battalion, The Royal Scots (The Royal Regiment)
- Quartermaster and Lieutenant Joseph Edward Pugh, Royal Army Medical Corps
- Captain Arthur Maxwell Ramsden, 8th Battalion, The West Yorkshire Regiment (The Prince of Wales's Own), Territorial Army
- Lieutenant Wilford Norman Reeve MC 4th/7th Dragoon Guards, Assistant Controller of Labour, British Army of the Rhine
- Captain William Herbert Ridgewell, 5th Battalion, The Bedfordshire and Hertfordshire Regiment, Territorial Army
- Regimental Quartermaster-Sergeant Robert Rowan DCM 9th (Glasgow Highlanders) Battalion, The Highland Light Infantry (City of Glasgow Regiment), Territorial Army
- Lieutenant Albert Rumbelow, The Suffolk Regiment
- First Class Staff Sergeant-Major Arthur John Ryan DCM Royal Army Service Corps
- Jemadar Sayed Gul Akber Shah, Sub Assistant Surgeon, 2nd Cavalry Regiment, Iraq Levies
- Quartermaster and Captain Gilbert Scofield, 1st Battalion, The Royal Welsh Fusiliers
- Lieutenant Raja Sher Muhammad Khan, 1st Battalion, 15th Punjab Regiment, Indian Army
- Quartermaster and Lieutenant Francis John Snell, 4th Battalion, The Somerset Light Infantry (Prince Albert's), Territorial Army
- Sub Conductor Francis William Speare, Indian Miscellaneous List
- Company Sergeant-Major Robert Stuart, The Seaforth Highlanders (Rossshire Buffs, The Duke of Albany's) attached The Lovat's Scouts, Territorial Army
- Quartermaster and Captain Charles Starkey Sykes, Royal Engineers
- Staff Sergeant-Major Herbert Tovell, Royal Army Service Corps
- Quartermaster and Lieutenant Ernest John Meno Van Walwyk MM 28th London Regiment, Territorial Army
- Regimental Sergeant-Major John George Venning, attached Iraq Levies
- Captain William Warr, 48th (South Midland) Divisional Engineers, Royal Engineers, Territorial Army
- Company Sergeant-Major Harold Wheeler, The Worcestershire Regiment, Senior Officers School, Belgaum, India
- Company Sergeant-Major Cyril Arthur George Wilde, attached Iraq Levies
- Assistant Surgeon Henry Carlyle William Windsor, Indian Medical Department

Royal Air Force

- Flying Officer Allan Lanman AFC
- Flying Officer Graham Stuart Smith
- Flying Officer Frank Henry Whitmore DSC
- Sergeant-Major William Webster

===== Civil Division =====
- Millicent Fanny, Amor, Headmistress, St. Pancras Church Girls School
- William George Appleyard, Superintendent, Middlesbrough Special Constabulary
- Frederick John Barton, Local Accountant, Ministry of Labour
- Kate Barnard Blaikley, Accounting Clerk and Lady Superintendent, Imperial War Graves Commission
- Thomas Davidson Boyd For public services.
- Richard Bradshaw, Clerk, Royal Arsenal, Woolwich
- Walter Henry Brett, Superintendent, Sussex (West) Constabulary
- Charles Strutton Brookes, Food Inspector, Port of Harwich
- Augustus Tares Clarke Campbell, Superintendent, Derbyshire Constabulary
- Thomas Carruthers, Superintendent, Durham Constabulary
- Captain John Edward Carter, Ex-Soldier Clerk, War Office
- George Henry Chapman, Superintending Clerk, War Office
- Richard Clayton, Chief Clerk to the Commandant, Royal Military College, Sandhurst
- Major Richard Charles Cole TD Commander, Honourable Artillery Company Division, Metropolitan Special Constabulary, Reserve
- John William Connaway, Waterguard Superintendent, 1st Class, Board of Customs and Excise
- Bridie Maureen Copeland, Sister, Kent County Mental Hospital
- Violet Caulfeild Cottell, Superintendent, Secretary of State's Clerical Staff, Foreign Office
- George Cox, Collector, Board of Inland Revenue
- Joseph Cravos, Superintendent, Cardiff Special Constabulary
- James Crawford, Superintendent of Lithography, General Staff, War Office
- John William Critchley Rector of Dumfries Academy
- Mary Cudworth, Member of the York, Selby and District War Pensions Committee
- John William Davidson, Senior Staff Clerk, Ministry of Health
- John Davies, Superintendent, Glamorgan Constabulary
- Lawrence Victor Dawe, Commandant, Metropolitan Special Constabulary
- Paymaster Commander James Godfrey Dendy RD RNR Senior Chief Superintendent, Mercantile Marine Office, Board of Trade
- William Duffus, Superintendent, Ayrshire Constabulary
- Captain Richard Embleton MC Inspector, Newcastle Special Constabulary
- Adolphus Sydney Francis, Superintendent, Essex Special Constabulary
- Robert Gardiner, Superintendent, Durham Constabulary
- George Goodchild, Clerk and Steward, Hertford County Mental Hospital
- Robinett Grandy, Collector, Board of Inland Revenue
- Charles William Grant, Principal Foreman of Storehouses, Admiralty
- Herbert William Gunston, Headmaster, Long Ashton School, Somerset
- William Thomas Hall, Chief Clerk in the Prison Commission
- William John Harris, Civil Assistant, Royal Air Force Stores, Kidbrooke
- John Frederick Hayes For public services.
- John Hepworth, Assistant Accountant, Ministry of Health
- Edward John Hill, Late Warship Production Superintendent, Admiralty
- Frederick Newman Hoare, Staff Clerk, Ministry of Labour
- Samuel John Holloway, Postmaster of Bromley and Beckenham
- Major Edward Marshall Holmes MC TD Sheffield Special Constabulary
- Flight Lieutenant (retd.) Frederick James Hooper, Technical Officer, Royal Aircraft Establishment
- Thomas West Horton, Superintendent, West Riding of Yorkshire Constabulary
- Edward Harold Howell, Clerk for Legal Instruments, Colonial Office
- David Hutchinson, Superintendent, Northumberland Constabulary
- Flora Elizabeth Jefferies, Member of the Southend-on-Sea War Pensions Committee
- George Ernest Johnson, Chief Superintendent, Bradford City Police
- George Oxton Kirkham Jones, Headmaster, Tennyson Street Council School, Battersea
- George Ernest Kendall ARIBA Assistant Architect, Board of Education
- William George Kershaw FSIA Senior Sanitary Inspector under the Hampstead Metropolitan Borough Council
- Claude Henry Klyne, Assistant Electrical Engineer, Admiralty
- Joseph George Lansberry, Superintendent, Manchester City Police
- Arthur Samuel George Lovell, Superintendent, Dorsetshire Police
- Sarah Lovell, Head Nurse, London County Mental Hospital, Claybury
- Mildred Shirley Lowe, Superintendent Health Visitor and Inspector of Midwives in Warwickshire
- Charles George Maby, Superintendent, Bristol City Police
- William John McCaghey, Deputy Chief Inspector, Ministry of Labour, Northern Ireland
- Patrick Joseph McGlade, late Senior Inspector, Ministry of Education, Northern Ireland
- William Millerchip JP Manager, Vauxhall Employment Exchange
- Joan Mitchell, Higher Executive Officer, Ministry of Health
- Thomas Mitchell, Staff Officer, Board of Inland Revenue
- William Charles George Moger, Higher Executive Officer, Ministry of Pensions
- Annie Newman, Head Nurse, London County Mental Hospital, Horton
- Edward William Norris. For public services.
- John Walker Oldfield, H.M. Inspector (Immigration), Home Office
- James Orton, Superintendent, Metropolitan Police
- Mildred Florence Paget, Clerk in the Foreign Office
- John Palmer. For public services.
- Bertram Park, Commandant, Metropolitan Special Constabulary
- Reginald Thomas Parkin, Assistant Director, Passport Control Department, Foreign Office
- Henrietta Peeke, Headmistress, Church Girls School, Hadleigh, West Suffolk
- John Lewis Rees, Superintendent, Glamorgan Constabulary
- John Ross, Deputy, Chief Constable and Superintendent, Ross and Cromarty Constabulary
- Dane Wilding Salter, Deputy Victualling Store Officer, Admiralty
- Mary Gaskell Seed, Superintendent Health Visitor, Manchester
- John Francis Shelswell, Superintendent, Gloucestershire Constabulary
- Benjamin Skinner, Headmaster of Strichen Higher Grade Public School
- Georgie May Smith General Secretary, Official Medical History of the War
- Vera Alexandra Paton-Smith, a Controller of Women's Staff, General Staff, War Office
- Walter James Smith, Senior Staff Officer, Board of Trade
- Lawrence Hubert Spendlove, Superintendent, Monmouthshire Constabulary
- George Arthur Grantham Stanley
- Senior Staff Officer, Board of Trade
- Frances Stevenson, Chief Superintendent of Typists, Board of Customs and Excise
- Harry Rawlings Taylor, Accountant, Ministry of Labour
- Willie Taylor, Member of Chester, Runcorn and District War Pensions Committee
- Francis Tucker, Chief Superintendent, Staffordshire Constabulary
- Percival Ernest Wagstaff, Head of the Bethnal Green Men's Institute
- John Randle Walker Assistant Registrar-General, Northern Ireland
- Prank Llewellyn Warren, Divisional Commander, City of London Special Constabulary
- William Henry Welsh, Superintendent, Lanarkshire Constabulary
- Edward Wheeler, Technical Assistant, Directorate of Artillery, War Office

In recognition of the conspicuous ability and courage displayed by the under-mentioned Officer of the S.S. Sunning in recovering their vessel which had been captured by pirates off the coast of China on 15 November 1926 —

- George Cormack, Chief Engineer

British India

- Captain Francis Maxwell-Lawford, Administrative Commandant, Madras University Training Corps
- Honavar Harischandra, Deputy Superintendent of Police, Bombay
- Felix Lawrence Newman, Deputy Superintendent of Police, Punjab
- William Benham Moorman, Superintendent, Quartermaster-General's Branch, Army Headquarters
- William John Rades, Superintendent, Military Secretary's Branch, Army Headquarters
- Pestonji Bezonji TaJati, Advocate, Government Pleader, Dehra Dun, United Provinces
- Purushottama Padmanabha Pillai, Member of the League of Nations Secretariat, Geneva
- George Edwin Moore, Extra Assistant to His Majesty's Consul for Sistan and Kain, East Persia
- Joseph Balthazar de Silva ISO Superintendent, Office of the Military Secretary to His Excellency the Governor of Bombay
- Edwin Alfred John Barnes, Senior Inspector, Harbour Police, Aden. Claude Stanley Ricketts, Personal Stenographer to His Excellency the Viceroy
- James Eyan, Secretary, Upper India Chamber of Commerce, Cawnpore
- Peter Sydenham Paulit, late Assistant Registrar, English Office, High Court, Calcutta
- Edith, Lady Heald, Rangoon
- Helen King, Bengal
- Kobad Dhunjibhai Mugaseth, Medical
- Practitioner, Calicut, Madras

Diplomatic Service and Overseas List

- Ewen Campbell MC Assistant District Commissioner, Sudan Government
- Hilda Conquest, Private Secretary to Financial Adviser, Egyptian Government
- Samuel James Dawson, Superintendent of Soldiers and Sailors Institute, Alexandria
- William Seymour Dean, Inspector of Customs, Sudan Government
- Angus Faulkner, Vice-Consul at Croix
- Leveson Gerrish, Finance Inspector, Sudan Government
- Agnes Gibson, Head Mistress of Scottish School for Girls, Alexandria
- John Edwin Harris, Inspector of Surveys, Sudan Government
- Joseph Tetley Hirst, Manager, Gordon College Instructional Workshops, Khartoum
- Walter Frederick James, Pro-Consul at British Consulate-General at New York
- John Joannidis, Vice-Consul, Laurium, Greece
- Herbert Montague Johnson, Assistant Telegraph Engineer, Sudan Telegraphs
- Captain Herbert Frederick Kidd, Assistant District Commissioner, Sudan Political Service
- Harriet Lassell, Matron of Kasr el Aini Hospital, Cairo
- John Manly Lee, Assistant District Commissioner, Sudan Government
- Raleigh le May, British Consul at Memel
- Frederick Sampson Sillitoe, Superintendent of Government Gardens, Khartoum
- Sidney Duncan Stowe, Mercantile Marine Service, Board of Trade, acting British Vice-Consul at Port Said
- William Edward Laxton Sweet, Manager of Rengo News Agency Office, London
- Charles Edward Joseph Walkley, Inspector, Civil Department, Sudan Government

Colonies, Protectorates, etc

- Robert Barker Crusher, Assistant Inspector, Department of Surveys, Palestine
- Bertie Harry Easter, Headmaster of St. Mary's College, St. Lucia, for services in combatting the recent fire at Castries, St. Lucia
- Frank Tate Ellis, lately Headmaster, Bishop Gobat's School, Jerusalem
- Samuel John Forster, Unofficial Member of the Legislative Council of the Gambia
- Joseph Trousell Gilbert, First Assistant Secretary and Clerk of Councils, Zanzibar
- George William Hatchell, District Officer, Tanganyika Territory
- John Marcus Knight, Chief Clerk in the Office of the Governor of the Windward Islands, Clerk to the Executive Council of, the Island of Grenada
- Major Charles Lionel Grey Matthews Matthews-Donaldson, Aide-de-Camp and Private Secretary to the Governor of the Windward Islands, for services in combatting the recent fire at Castries, St. Lucia
- Robert Moffatt, Assistant Engineer, Posts and Telegraphs Department, Palestine
- Oliver Nugent, lately Additional Magistrate and Deputy Coroner, Antigua, Leeward Islands
- Antoni Papapetrou, Assistant. Registrar-General, Land Registration and Survey Department, Cyprus
- Charlotte Harriet Pidsley, Principal of the Annie Walsh Memorial School, Freetown, Sierra Leone
- Captain Frederick Brooke Sharp, Inspector of Police; St. Lucia, for service in combatting the recent fire at Castries, St. Lucia
- Alfred Thomas Sumner, Senior Master, Njala Agricultural College, Sierra Leone

Honorary Members

- Matheus Placido da Costa, Head Asiatic
- Clerk in the Secretariat, Uganda. Zaki Hadefi, Mayor of Tiberias, Palestine
- Ahmad Effendi Khaledi, Principal of the Men's Training College, Department of Education, Palestine
- Shawki Effendi Fatallah Saad, Assistant Superintendent of Police, Palestine
- Samuel Tolkowsky, of Tel Aviv, Palestine, in recognition of his public services.

=== Members of the Order of the Companions of Honour (CH) ===
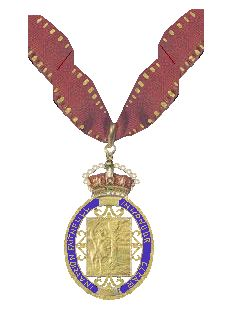
The riband and badge of the Companions of Honour

- The Reverend John Daniel Jones Chairman of the Congregational Union of England and Wales, 1909–10 and 1925–26

=== Royal Red Cross (RRC) ===
Second Class

In recognition of-the special devotion and competency displayed by them in their nursing duties with the British Forces in Iraq

- Emily de la Hoyde, Matron, Indian Nursing Service
- Catherine Annie Waugh, Nursing Sister, Indian Nursing Service

=== Kaisar-i-Hind Medal ===
First Class

- The Reverend Caleb Davies, Medical Superintendent, Sonthal Mission Hospital, Sarenga, Bankura, Bengal
- Ethel Adelaide Douglas Medical Officer in charge of the Kinnaird Women's Hospital, Lucknow
- Doctor Carl Fredrik Kugelberg, Church of Sweden Mission, Tirupattur, Ramnad District, Madras
- The Reverend David Beid Gordon, American Presbyterian Mission, Gurdaspur District, Punjab
- The Reverend Luigi Carlo Perfumi, Church Missionary Society, Muzaffarnagar, United Provinces
- Mary Isabel Buddie, Madras
- Bachel Piggott, Zenana Mission, Hyderabad, Sind, Bombay

=== British Empire Medal (BEM) ===
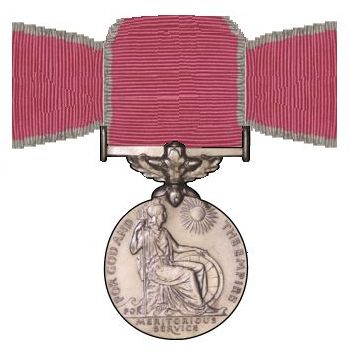
The British Empire Medal for meritorious service

==== Military Division ====
For Meritorious Service

- Sapper John Wilfred Archer, Royal Engineers
- Corporal Henry Bellringer, Royal Corps of Signals
- Sergeant Walter Thomas Bristow, 19th (Survey) Company, Royal Engineers
- Company Sergeant-Major Dan Daura, late Nigeria Regiment, West African Frontier Force
- Sergeant Harry Sandle, Royal Engineers
- Sergeant George Wallace Hepple RAF
- Corporal William Joshua Leslie Brown RAF
- Aircraftman William Howson RAF

==== Civil Division ====
For Meritorious Service

- Edward Bastable, Chief Officer, Wandsworth Prison
- Isaac Bayles, Constable, Durham Constabulary
- Alan Bent, Inspector, Gloucestershire Constabulary
- Robert Boone, Inspector, Manchester City Police
- Sidney Clarke, Acting Sergeant, Glamorgan Constabulary
- William Cooper, Sergeant, Lancashire Constabulary
- John Gunn, Constable, Durham Constabulary
- Thomas Egerton, Inspector, Lancashire Constabulary
- Fadl Musa, Sergeant, Darfur Province Police
- Frederick Norman Perry, Temp. Constable (First Reserve), Glamorgan Constabulary
- David Tudor Picton, Acting Sergeant, Glamorgan Constabulary
- Biehard Pryor, Inspector, Plymouth Police
- William Edward Bees, Inspector, Glamorgan Constabulary
- John Beid, Constable, Durham Constabulary
- Mark Thompson, Inspector, Durham Constabulary
- John Turner, Inspector, Derbyshire Constabulary
- Edwin Walbyoff, Sergeant, Monmouthshire Constabulary
- Elizabeth Kate Woods, Chief Officer, Holloway Prison
- Alexander Young, Inspector, Northumberland Constabulary
- George Woodworth, Sergeant, Lancashire Constabulary

=== Air Force Cross (AFC) ===
- Bernard More Troughton Shute Leete, (Flying Officer, Reserve of Air Force Officers), in recognition of the distinguished service rendered to aviation by his recent flight in a light aeroplane from London to Delhi.
- Flight Lieutenant Gerard Stephen Oddie DFC
- Flying Officer Ardley George Pickering
- Squadron Leader Harry George Smart OBE DFC
- Thomas Neville Stack (Flying Officer, Reserve of Air Force Officers), in recognition of the distinguished service rendered to aviation by his recent flight in a light aeroplane from London to Delhi.

==== Awarded a Bar to the Air Force Cross (AFC*) ====
- Flight Lieutenant Ivor Ewing McIntyre CBE AFC Royal Australian Air Force, in recognition of the distinguished services rendered on the recent seaplane flight from Melbourne to the British Solomon Islands and back.

=== Air Force Medal ===
- Sergeant (Pilot) George Edward Lowdell
- Corporal Leslie Joseph Trist, Royal Australian Air Force, in recognition of the distinguished services rendered on the recent seaplane flight from Melbourne to the British Solomon Islands and back.

=== Imperial Service Order (ISO) ===
Home Civil Service

- William James Anderson, Staff Officer, British Museum
- Arthur Carwithen, Principal Clerk, Paymaster-General's Office
- Wallace John Elvy, Principal Ship Surveyor, Board of Trade
- William Field, Clerk in Charge of Accounts, Civil Service Commission
- David Frizzell, Accountant and Controller of the Finance of Local Education Schemes, Ministry of Education, Northern Ireland
- Andrew Froude, Secretary and Chief Clerk, General Registry Office, Scotland
- Ernest Leslie Holland, Senior Examiner, Estate Duty Office, Board of Inland Revenue
- William Rees Jarman Actuary, Government Actuary's Department
- Claude Reynolds Leak, Principal, Ministry of Pensions
- Charles William Lumley, Staff Clerk, Privy Council Office
- Charles Henry William O'Brien MBE Registrar, Audit Department, National Insurance
- Hugh Ritchie OBE Technical Assistant in Treaty Department, Foreign Office
- John Sankey, First Class Officer, Employment and Insurance Branch, Ministry of Labour
- Thomas Elias Tutton, Director, Investigation Department, General Post Office

Dominions

- Charles Hay Dewhirst, Secretary to the Commissioner of Public Works and to the Minister of Railways, State, of South Australia
- Frederick James Jones MVO Chairman of the Government Railway Board, Dominion of New Zealand
- Edward Joseph Mulvany, Secretary to the Department of Markets and Migration, Commonwealth of Australia
- Louis Edward Shapcott MVO Secretary of the Premier's Department and Chairman, of the State Gardens; Board, State of Western Australia

Indian Civil Service

- John; Jebaratnam Hensman, Manager, Office of the University of Madras
- Bhai Ram Dyal, Superintendent, Deputy Commissioner's Office, Gurdaspur, Punjab

Colonial Civil Service

- Caddie Augustus Bartlett, lately Police Magistrate and Coroner, Barbados
- Henry Dixon, Superintendent, Money Order Office, General Post Office, Hong Kong
- Henry Alexander Martin, Accountant and Financial Assistant, Treasury, Ceylon
- Charles James Perkins, Assistant Surveyor-General, Straits Settlements and Federated Malay States
- John Henry Stanley Robbin, Chief Registrar of the Supreme Court, Nigeria

=== Imperial Service Medal (ISM) ===
- Natha Jiva, Naik in the Office of the Executive Engineer, Kaira and Panch Mahals Division, Bombay
