= Ghamaila =

Ghamaila is a subdivision of the Kurmi caste.They have traditionally been a prominent, landholding class of big farmers and zamindars in the Magadh region of Bihar in eastern India, south of the river Ganges.

The Ghamaila community is predominantly found in the following districts of Bihar:

- Nalanda
- Patna
- Nawada
- Gaya
- Jamui
- Jahanabaad
- Munger

A sizable section of the community has established itself in major metropolitan centers like Delhi, Mumbai and Bangalore.

Some famous people from the Ghamaila caste:

- (1) Siddheshwar Prasad (Former Governor of Tripura)
- (2) Shyam Narayan Singh (Freedom fighter)
- (3) Narendra Prasad (surgeon) (A distinguished doctor and recipient of the Padma Shri award)
- (4) Kumar Ravi (an alumnus of the IIT and an IAS officer with an all India rank of 10, is currently among the top bureaucrats of Bihar)
- (5) Pulak Chandan Prasad (Founder and MD of Nalanda Capital Pte Limited)
- (6) Manoj Sinha (Founder and CEO of Husk Power Systems, he was named among the 100 most influential business leaders by the Time magazine)https://www.ceraweek.com/en/speakers/manoj-sinha-1060-24491
- (7) Kaushalendra Kumar (Four-time consecutive MP from Nalanda)
- (8) Dr. Jitendra Kumar (MLA, Asthawan)
- (9) Manish Kumar Verma (Former IAS officer and JDU leader)
- (10) Kundan Krishnan (Currently DG and one of the most distinguished & decorated IPS officers from Bihar)
- (11) Ashish Ranjan Sinha (Ex DGP Bihar)
- (12) Ashok Mahato (Samaj sevi and RJD leader)
- (13) Randhir Kumar Soni (Ex-MLA, Sheikhpura)
- (14) Pradeep Kumar/Pradeep Mahato (Ex-MLA, Warsaliganj)
- (15) Dillip Kumar Patel (Founder and Chairman of Patel Agri Industries Private Limited Group)
- (16) Ashish Bharati (DIG Begusarai Range)
- (17) Satya Prakash (DIG Shahabad Range)
- (18) Tripurari Singh and Sudhir Kumar Singh (Samaj sevi leader, Nalanda)
- (19) Vishwa Mohan Chaudhary (Ex-MLA, Barh)
- (20) Inderdev Chaudhary (Ex-MLA, Asthawan)
- (21) Arun Kumar Singh (Ex-MLA, Harnaut)
- (22) Satish Kumar (Ex-MLA, Asthawan)
- (23) Ravindra Kumar Singh (MLC JDU)
- (24) Rajeev Ranjan (Ex-MLA, Islampur)
- (25) Chandrasen Prasad (Ex-MLA Islampur)
- (26) Usha Sinha (Ex-MLA, Islampur)
- (27) Lalkeshwar Prasad Singh (Former BSEB Chairman)
- (28) Sanjeev Mukhiya (Strongman from Nagarnausa, Nalanda)
- (29) Ranjeet Don (Strongman from Hilsa, Nalanda)
