= Kissack =

Kissack is a surname. Notable people with the surname include:

- Eric Kissack (born 1977), American film editor
- Keith Kissack (1913–2010), English historian
- Wilfred Kissack (1873–1942), Manx Anglican priest

== See also ==
- Kissack, an Isle of Man Railway locomotive
- McKissack (disambiguation)
