= George Grabham =

George Grabham may refer to:

- George Wallington Grabham (1836–1912), New Zealand doctor and health administrator
- George Walter Grabham (1882–1955), British geologist
