= Order of the Medjidie =

Ottoman Empire military and civilian award

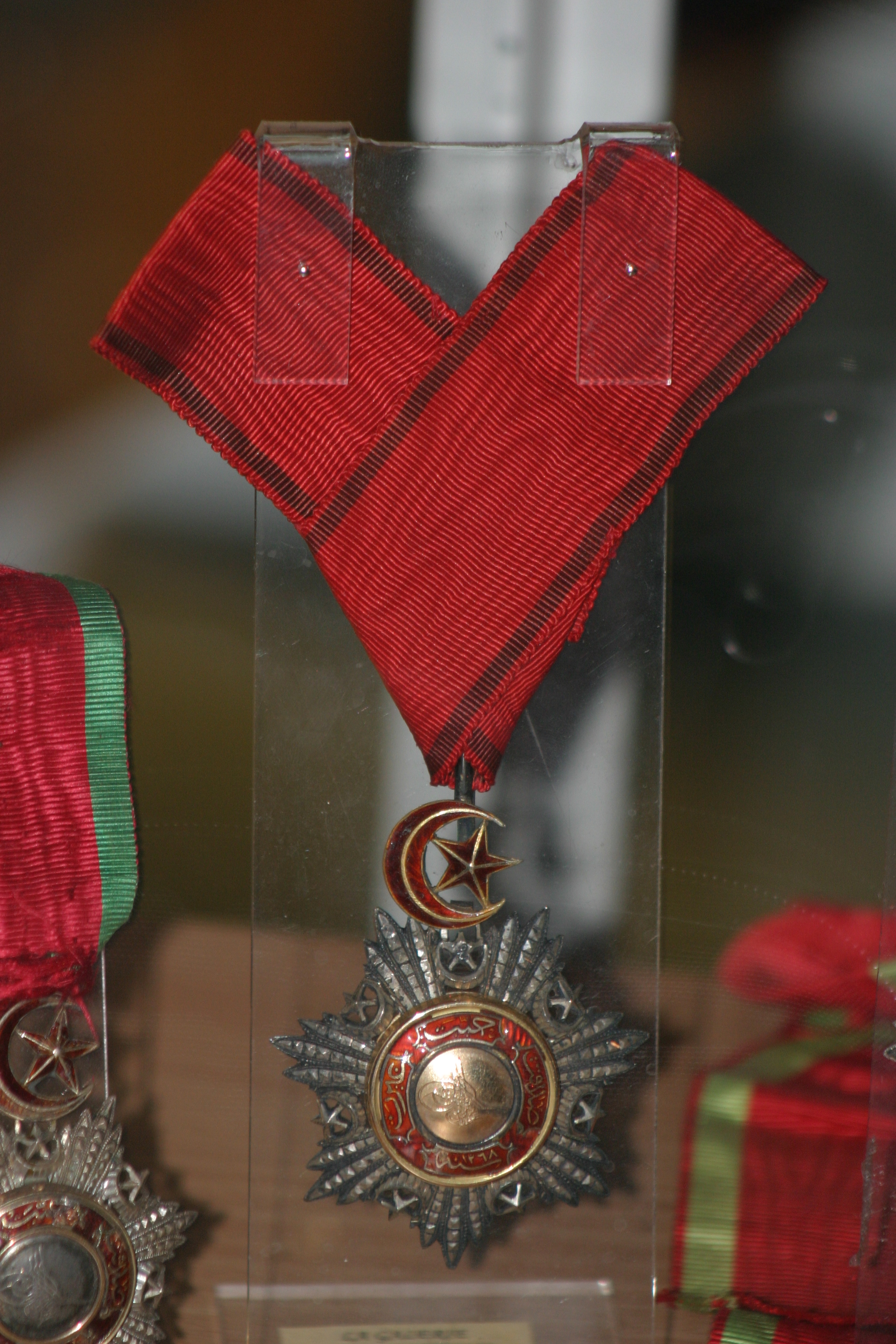
- Arms of the Order of the Medjidie
- Type: Order
- Awarded for: Outstanding services to the state by Ottomans and foreign nationals
- Country: Ottoman Empire
- Presented by: Ottoman Sultan
- Eligibility: Civilians and military
- Status: No longer awarded
- Established: 1851
- First award: 1851
- Final award: 1917
- Ribbon bar of the medal

Order of the Medjidie (Ottoman Turkish: نشانِ مجیدیه, August 29, 1852 – 1922) was a military and civilian order of the Ottoman Empire. The order was instituted in 1851 by Sultan Abdulmejid I.

== History ==
Instituted in 1851, the order was awarded in five classes, with the First Class being the highest. The order was issued in considerable numbers by Sultan Abdülmecid as a reward for distinguished service to members of the British Army and the Royal Navy and the French Army who came to the aid of the Ottoman Empire during the Crimean War against Russia and to British recipients for later service in Egypt and/or the Sudan. In Britain it was worn after any British gallantry and campaign medals awarded, but, as an order, before foreign medals like the Turkish Crimean War medal. The order was usually conferred on officers but a few enlisted soldiers and sailors also received it in a lower class. During World War I it was also awarded to a number of German, Austrian, and Bulgarian officers.

The order was often conferred on non-Turkish nationals.

== Design of the order ==
On the obverse of the star is Sultan Abdülmecid's royal cipher surrounded by an inscription on a gold-bordered circle of red enamel; all on a star of seven triple quills with small crescents and five-pointed stars between them, suspended from a red enameled crescent and star suspender with green enameled edges.

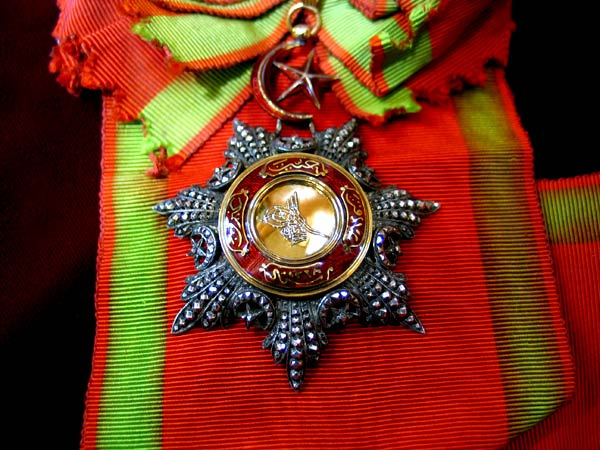
First Class Order

Rough translation of the front: To the left: (you have) crossed. To the right: (you are proven to be) correct. At the top: (you have provided) protection. At the bottom: Year 1268. In the centre: In the name of the God the forgiver, the merciful.

The order has 5 classes. First, second, third and fourth classes are gold. Fifth (lower) class is silver.

Owners of the order:

- First Class Order (Gold) – 50 people (given by Sultan)
- Second Class Order (Gold) – 150 people (given by Sultan)
- Third Class Order (Gold) – 800 people
- Fourth Class Order (Gold) – 3,000 people
- Fifth Class Order (Silver) – 6,000 people

== Some notable recipients ==
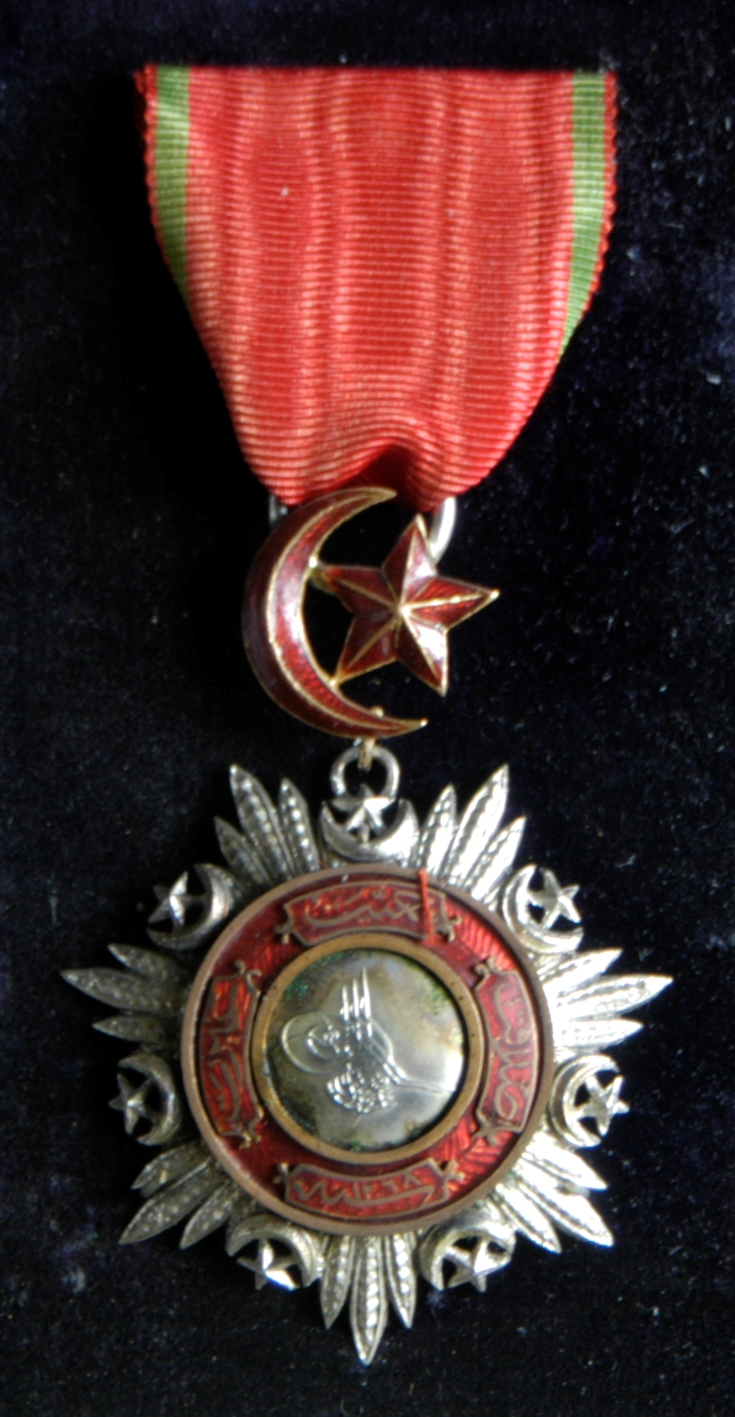
Order of the Medjidie awarded to Major Rodolph De Salis (1811-1880) of the 8th Hussars

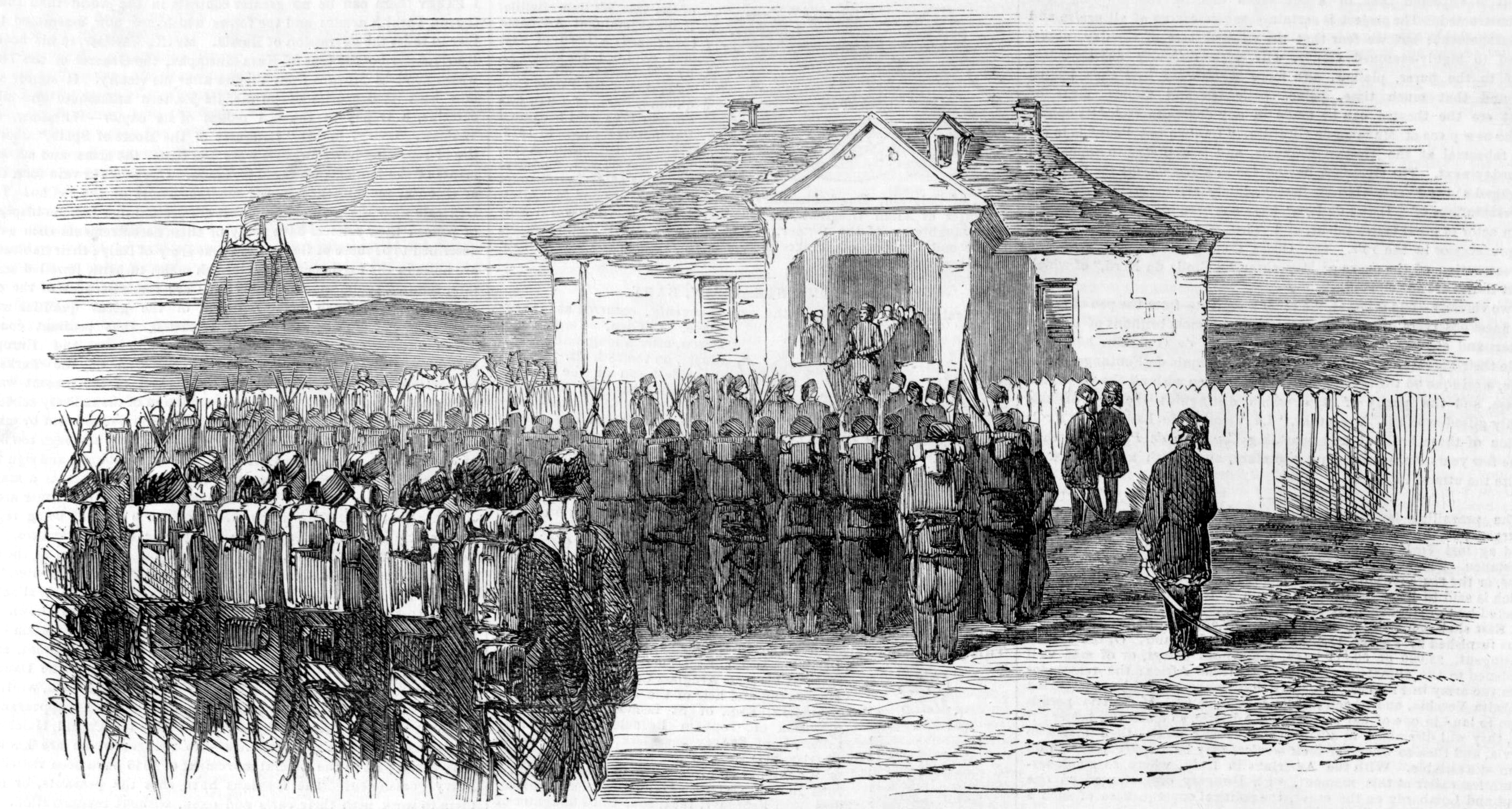
Distribution of the Medjidie, after the Battle of Cetate (1854)

- Abdelkader El Djezairi, Algerian Islamic scholar and political and military leader who led a struggle against the French invasion.
- Shemaiah Angel
- Abraham Ashkenazi, chief rabbi of Palestine
- Khazʽal Ibn Jabir The Ruler of Arabistan, the Sheikh of Mohammerah
- Mustafa Kemal Atatürk, Ottoman Army officer
- Lucien Baudens, French military surgeon
- Friedrich von Beck-Rzikowsky, Austrian field marshal, chief of the general staff of the Imperial and Royal Army of Austria-Hungary
- Mohammed Shitta Bey, First titled Seriki Musulumi of Lagos & foremost Muslim trader of the Lagos Colony
- Muhammad Amin Asiyalav, dictator of Circassia
- Edward Wilmot Blyden, pan-Africanist and Liberian statesman
- Lord Blyth James Blyth, 1st Baron Blyth, British businessman and politician
- Ellerington William Buckley, Executive Engineer, First Class Egyptian Irregation Service, Aswan Lower Dam. London Gazette 25th October 1912
- Eugène Chauffeur (1830–1904), French Army officer, commander of the Legion of Honour
- Dimitrije Cincar-Marković, Serbian prime minister and general
- Carol Davila
- Charles Doughty-Wylie, English army officer who was later killed in the Gallipoli campaign, ironically in action against Ottoman forces.
- Arthur Conan Doyle, Scottish author
- Richard England, British soldier
- Pierre Louis Charles de Failly, French soldier
- Emanuele Luigi Galizia, Maltese architect and civil engineer
- Romolo Gessi Pasha, british-italian soldier and explorer
- Major-General Charles George Gordon, Gordon of Khartoum
- George Walter Grabham, British geologist
- Tadeusz Przemysław Michał Grocholski (1839–1913), Polish painter
- Field Marshal Sir Frederick Haines GCB GCSI CIE (1890–1909)
- George Alfred Henty, English commissariat officer and author
- Theodor Herzl, journalist and Zionist leader
- Auguste Lumière, French industrialist and biologist
- Léon-Eugène Méhédin, French architect and photographer
- Rafael de Nogales Méndez, Venezuelan soldier, adventurer and writer.
- Živojin Mišić, Serbian field marshal and Chef of General Staff
- Helmuth von Moltke the Elder, Prussian Army officer
- Sir William Montgomery-Cuninghame, 9th Baronet, British Army Officer and Victoria Cross recipient
- Napoleon III, Emperor of The French
- Yosef Navon, Jerusalem businessman and the man principally responsible for the construction of the Jaffa–Jerusalem railway
- Rear-Admiral Maurice Horatio Nelson, son of Thomas Nelson, 2nd Earl Nelson
- Shibli Nomani (1857–1914), Indian Islamic scholar, poet, philosopher, historian
- Haim Palachi, chief rabbi of Izmir
- General Sir William Parke, British soldier
- Louis Pasteur, French chemist and microbiologist
- Lord George Paulet, British naval officer
- Pedro II of Brazil, Emperor of Brazil
- Rahime Perestu Sultan (c. 1830 – c. 1906), valide Sultan (queen mother) of Ottoman Empire
- Hans Heinrich XV, Prince of Pless, German diplomat and industrialist
- Oswald Longstaff Prowde, English civil engineer on Aswan Low Dam
- Ludomił Rayski, Polish pilot
- Jules Ernest Renoux, French painter
- Cecil Spring Rice, British diplomat
- Pierre-Auguste Sarrus, French musician
- Charles Pomeroy Stone, career U.S. Army officer, post Civil War soldier of fortune in Ottoman service
- Emanuel Stross (1841–1913), Austrian wholesaler in Egypt
- Charles Carroll Tevis, American soldier of fortune and Anatolian Cavalry leader
- Alfred Tippinge, British Army officer of the Grenadier Guards, and Legion of Honour recipient
- Maréchal Vaillant
- Fabian Jakob Wrede, Swedish scientist and military officer.
- Princess Victoria Louise of Prussia, Duchess Consort of Brunswick
- Karl Donitz, Former President of Germany and German admiral during WW1 and WW2
