= T. Neville Stack =

Captain Thomas Neville Stack CVO AFC (1 April 1896 – 22 February 1949) was a 1920s test pilot, air racer and aviation pioneer. He served in both the First and Second World Wars and in all three services. His son Neville Stack, born in 1919, became an Air Chief-Marshal in the Royal Air Force.

== First World War ==
Thomas Neville Stack left the Army to join the Royal Flying Corps in 1917, at the end of the war he became a flying instructor. In 1921 he re-joined the Royal Air Force and served in Iraq leaving in 1925 to become chief flying instructor with the Lancashire Aero Club.

== England to India ==
On 15 November 1926 Stack left England in at attempt to reach India in a De Havilland DH.60, he was accompanied by Bernard Leete in another Moth, they reached Karachi on 8 January 1927. In the 1927 Birthday Honours Stack and Leete were each awarded the Air Force Cross, Air Ministry, 3 June 1927, The King had been graciously pleased to approve the award of the Air Force Cross to Mr. Thomas Neville Stack (Flying Officer, Reserve of Air Force Officers), in recognition of the distinguished service rendered to aviation by his recent flight in a light aeroplane from London to Delhi.

== England to Australia ==
In 1934, to enable him to compete in the England-Australia MacRobertson Air Race, Stack together with Sidney Lewis Turner had a specially modified long-range version of the Airspeed Envoy (AS.6) built. It was named the Airspeed Viceroy (AS.8).

The Airspeed Viceroy started the race from RAF Mildenhall, England, but after several reliability problems including with the mainwheel brakes and the electrical systems, it was withdrawn from the race at Athens. The pilots concluded that it would be unsafe to proceed and they would probably be unable to finish the race. Subsequently, Stack started litigation against Airspeed, refusing to pay the balance outstanding on the aircraft. The Court found in essence that his claims of defects were a ruse to try to avoid payment, and he lost both his claim and Airspeed's counter-claim for the balance of the price of the aircraft and Stack & Turner were forced to return the aircraft (which later served in the Spanish Civil War) and pay substantial monies to Airspeed.

== Second World War ==
In the 1940s, he was Chief Test Pilot at Austin Motors where he flew new aircraft straight from the production lines. He later joined the Fleet Air Arm and commanded 742 Naval Air Squadron in Southern India.

== Death ==
Stack was a manager at Orient Airways when he died near Karachi, Pakistan on 22 February 1949. Newspaper reports that he was killed when he was run over by a lorry. The police alleged he threw himself under the vehicle. Stack had recently been interned by the Pakistan authorities (with regard a sale of a Dakota to India) but was allowed a daily visit to see his priest at Mauripore Airport and he is alleged to have thrown himself under the lorry while walking to the house of the priest. However, an inquest into his death – conducted by a local magistrate and Royal Navy medical officer – revealed Stack had suffered an aortic aneurysm prior to being struck by the lorry. His death was ruled to be by natural causes. The inquest was requested by his sons Anthony and Neville Stack, who flew to Pakistan after the local authorities alleged their father had committed suicide.

== See also ==
- MacRobertson Air Race
