= Bernard Leete =

English aviator (1898 - 1978)

- Born: Bernard More Troughton Shute Leete; 8 October 1898; Claygate, Surrey, England
- Died: 1978; Stanmore, Middlesex, England
- Occupations: RAF Pilot, Directorate of Civil Aviation in India
- Known for: First flight from England to India in a light aircraft

Bernard More Troughton Shute Leete OBE AFC (8 October 1898 – 1978) was an English aviator in the 1930s. He was an aviation pioneer and was awarded Officer of the Order of the British Empire for his achievements.

== England to India ==
In November 1926, Bernard Leete accompanied fellow aviation pioneer and air racer T.N. Stack made an attempt to reach Karachi (located in India at the time) in a De Havilland DH.60. They both reached their objective in June 1927 and he was awarded an AFC for his achievements.

== Honours and awards ==
- 1927 Birthday Honours Bernard More Troughton Shute Leete a Flying Officer in the Reserve of Air Force Officers is awarded the Air Force Cross "in recognition of the distinguished service rendered to aviation by his recent flight in a light aeroplane from London to Delhi"
- 1942 New Year Honours Bernard More Troughton Shute Leete a technical officer of the Civil Aviation Directorate of the Government of India is appointed an Officer of the Order of the British Empire.
