= Shemaiah Angel =

Shemaiah Angel was a Jewish banker and philanthropist of Ottoman Damascus. He was a benefactor to his Jewish brethren in Ottoman Syria and to the inhabitants of Damascus. After the suppression of the Druze outbreak in 1860, he distributed among the poor of all denominations in Damascus 3,000 Turkish pounds. At his own expense he provisioned for a time the Imperial troops in Damascus. In recognition of his services, the sultan Abdülaziz conferred upon him the Order of the Medjidie of the first class. He died in 1874. His son, Eleazar Angel, who lived at Constantinople, followed the example set by his father.
