= William Charles Fleming Robertson =

Governor of Barbados from 1925 to 1932

Sir William Charles Fleming Robertson KCMG (1867– 27 June 1937) was an acting governor of the Gold Coast in 1914, and a British colonial administrator, governor of Barbados from 1925 to 1932.

== Life ==
Robertson graduated B.A. at Trinity College, Dublin in 1889. He became inspector of schools in the Gold Coast in 1898. He took other posts there as his career developed. In 1914 he was acting governor of the Gold Coast.

In 1915 Robertson was transferred to Gibraltar, where he was colonial secretary. He was moved in 1917 to Malta, serving until 1925 as lieutenant governor. There he warned against a rise in the bread price in 1919, ahead of riots.

Robertson was appointed a Companion of the Order of St Michael and St George (CMG) in the 1919 New Year Honours, and promoted to Knight Commander of the Order (KCMG) in the 1927 Birthday Honours.

Robertson died in Gibraltar.

== Family ==
Robertson married in 1909 Elizabeth Dora Whelan, daughter of the Rev. Ernest Whelan, of Kilbride, County Wicklow. Robertson was survived by his wife, two sons and a daughter. Lady Robertson lived in a Hampton Court Palace apartment from 1947 to 1974. Their daughter Beatrice May (died 2010 at age 93) married J. A. G. Gribble of the Lancashire Fusiliers.
