= Eustace Shine =

English cricketer and civil servant (1873–1952)

Eustace Beverley Shine CB (9 July 1873 – 11 November 1952) was an English civil servant and amateur cricketer who played first-class cricket between 1895 and 1899.

== Early life and cricket ==
Shine was born on 9 July 1873 at Port of Spain at Trinidad where his father was a merchant. He was educated at Edward VI School in Saffron Walden and Selwyn College, Cambridge. He made his first-class debut for Cambridge University in 1895, and played 22 matches for them.

He won cricket Blues in 1896 and 1897, and made his debut for Kent in 1896. Shine played 23 matches for Kent, all but one of them during the 1896 and 1897 seasons, and also appeared in one match for Marylebone Cricket Club (MCC) against Cambridge. After the 1897 season he played in only one match, a single County Championship appearance for Kent against Lancashire at Canterbury in 1899. He was awarded his Kent county cap in 1896.

In the 1896 University Match Shine deliberately bowled three balls "straight to the boundary" in order to add to Oxford's total and avoid the need for Cambridge to enforce the follow-on. At the time it was compulsory to enforce the follow-on. Cambridge's Cyril Wells had done the same three years earlier. The Laws of Cricket were changed in 1900 to allow the option of enforcing the follow-on to rest with the team ahead.

Predominantly a bowler, Shine took a total of 165 first-class wickets in his 46 first-class matches. He took 10 wickets in a match twice and had best innings bowling figures of 7/65. His highest score batting was 49 runs, made in a partnership of 149 with Frank Marchant playing for Kent against Warwickshire at Tonbridge in 1897.

== Civil service career ==
In 1900 he became an inspector at the Board of Agriculture and served as a private secretary to two Presidents of the Board between 1905 and 1911 when he was appointed head of the livestock branch. From 1921 until he retired in 1933 he was establishment officer at the Ministry of Agriculture and Fisheries serving as an Assistant Secretary. Shine was made Companion of the Order of the Bath in the 1927 Birthday Honours.

== Family and later life ==
Shine married Mary Venables in 1900. The couple had a son. After his first wife died, he married Ida Cornwall in 1912 with whom he had three daughters. He died on 11 November 1952 at his home in New Milton, Hampshire aged 79.

== Bibliography ==
- Carlaw, Derek (2020). Kent County Cricketers, A to Z: Part One (1806–1914) (PDF). Cardiff: ACS.
