= Frederik Kugelberg =

Swedish physician and Christian missionary

Frederick Kugelberg
- Born: September 20, 1880; Ljungarum, Sweden
- Died: April 29, 1963 (aged 82)
- Education: M.D. Karolinska Institute at Uppsala University
- Occupations: Physician, Medical Missionary

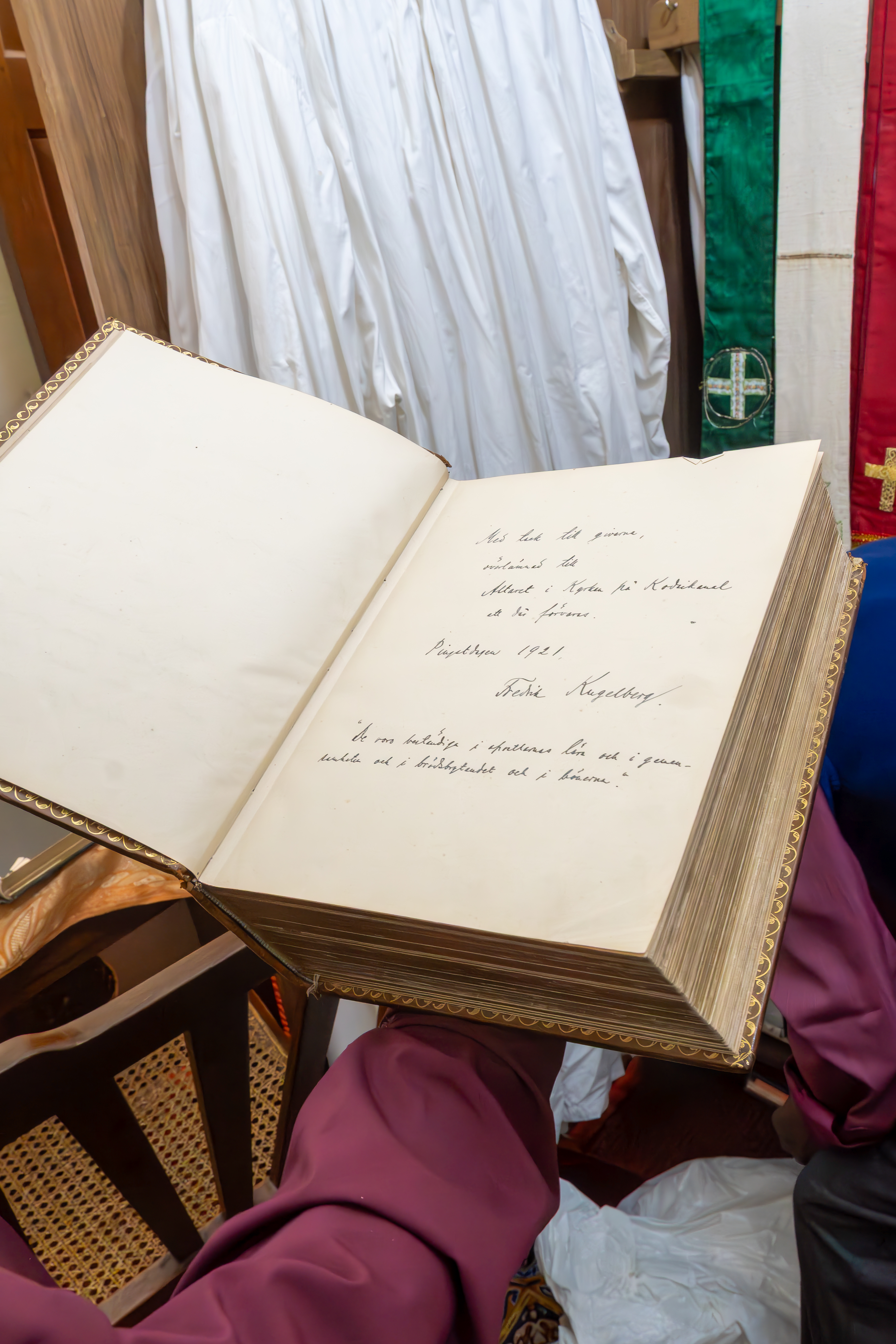
Bible signed by Frederik Kugelberg, at the T.E.L.C. Jubilee Church at the old German/Swedish Compound in Kodaikanal, South-India

Frederik Carl Kugelberg M.D. (September 20, 1880 – April 29, 1963) was a Swedish physician and Christian missionary to the south Indian state of Tamil Nadu who developed much of south India's lasting healthcare infrastructure.

== Early life and education ==
Kugelberg was born to a modest family on September 20, 1880, in Ljungarum, Sweden. He received his M.D. from the Karolinska Institute at Uppsala University in Stockholm. Following his clinical training, he felt a spiritual calling and immediately left for south India on December 8, 1905, under the mission of the Swedish Church. The Church of Sweden under the 1904 Diocese of Luleå cared much for spreading healing to southeastern Asia.

== Missionary Service ==
=== Tamil Nadu ===
When he first came to the state of Tamil Nadu, Kugelberg settled in the city of Pattukottai to conduct field research about the prevalence of disease. Kugelberg focused his efforts on treating two conditions: cataracts and leprosy. He then traveled to the more populated city of Tirupattur to implement his research. He founded the Swedish Mission Hospital in Tirupattur and was chief medical officer from 1909 to 1932. Kugelberg introduced novel cataract surgeries and leprosy antibiotics to the population. There were significant improvements in patient outcomes. In addition, Kugelberg gave particular care to the female workers and patients. As a result of his work, Kugelberg received approval from the dominion of Madras (Chennai, Tamil Nadu) to continue his practice in neighboring cities as well. So in 1926, Kugelberg opened the Moses Gnanaparanam Eye Hospital at Coimbatore.

==== Moses Gnanaparanam Hospital and eye clinics ====
The growth of the Moses Gnanaparanam Hospital was fast and it achieved equal success to the hospital in Tirupattur. His Excellency George Stanley, the then Governor of Madras, appreciated the "noble deeds" and requested Kugelberg to continue such "worthy" services to impoverished, rural communities. The British-colonized government realized the dire necessity for healthcare and decided to sponsor Kugelberg's services indefinitely.

==== School for the blind ====
Kugelberg particularly began believing in the Bible's verses regarding the blind being healed by Jesus Christ. Convinced of the mission, he opened a school for the blind in Tirupattur in the year 1929. Kugelberg not only performed surgery but taught the patients braille, music theory, and musical instruments. The blind were also trained in dancing, basket making, and handicrafts, which were then exported for profit. Kugelberg valued such economic incentivisation and the lasting effects it would have for the sustainability of the people.

=== Religious service ===
Kugelberg came to serve the neighboring rural communities. It was his belief that Christian compassion and obedience would reduce symptoms of sickness. He preached the Gospel regularly when consulting patients and is recognized for converting many Hindus to Christianity. Part of his message was equality between the sexes. In this vein, he opened a Christian teaching hospital for nurses in Madurai, as a way of including more women in healthcare.

== Legacy ==
Kugelberg spent the majority of his life in India, providing medical care and developing hospitals and policy. He knew that medical care was temporary, and that educative hospital experiences would prove to be more effective in the long-term. His name is inscribed in the Swedish Mission Hospital in Tirupattur. As a mark of respect, in Dr. Kugelberg's golden jubilee year, another large building was built in his honor. It was named as the Kugelberg Women and Children's Ward.

Kugelberg's wife, Eva Karolina Kugelberg, fell ill in 1932 and left India. Dr. Kugelberg followed soon after. After leaving India and returning to Sweden in 1932, he received an honorary commendation by Uppsala University the same year. Kugelberg died April 29, 1963, in Sweden. Inspired by his work his sister, Sonja Kugelberg, opened a Swedish home for the blind in 1971. It remains operation in 2019.
