= Shyam Narayan Singh =

Freedom fighter of india

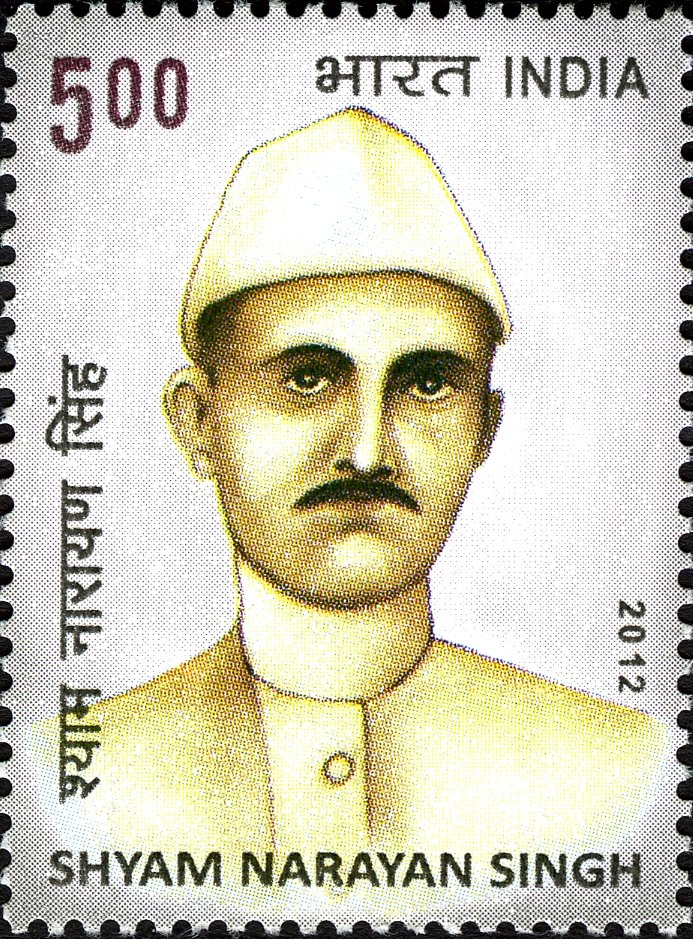

Shyam Narayan Singh was an Indian freedom fighter and politician who served as Member of Central Legislative Assembly from East Bihar. On 24 January 2012, Government of India honored him by issuing commemorative stamp on him.

He was appointed a Commander of the Order of the British Empire (CBE) in the 1927 Birthday Honours, in recognition of his service as a member of the legislative assembly.

== Personal life ==
He was born in 1901 in Bind village, Nalanda district, into a zamimdar Ghamaila Kurmi family.
