= Narendra Prasad (surgeon) =

Indian surgeon

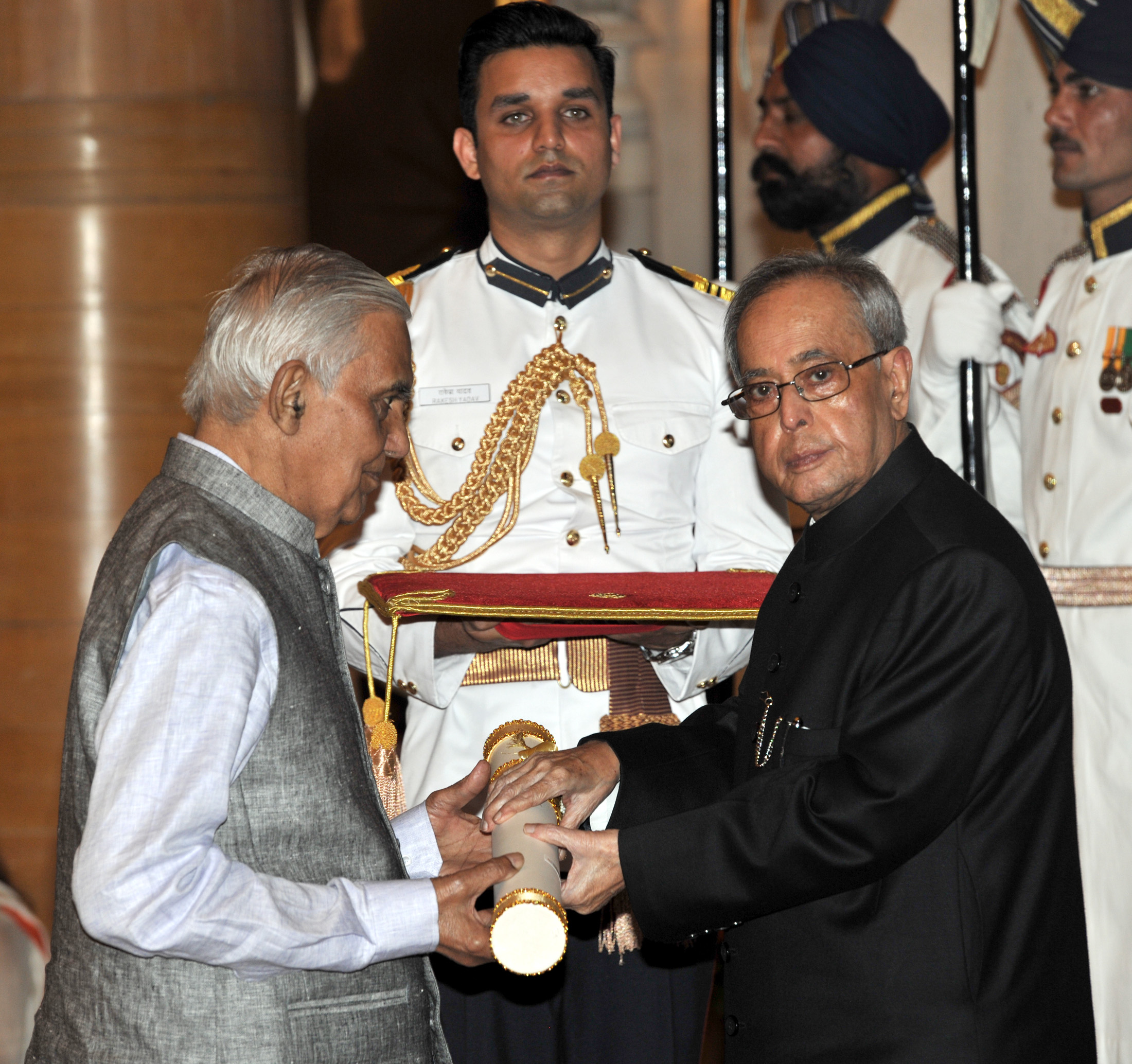
The President, Shri Pranab Mukherjee presenting the Padma Shri Award to Dr. Narendra Prasad, at a Civil Investiture Ceremony, at Rashtrapati Bhavan, in New Delhi on April 08, 2015

Narendra Prasad is an Indian surgeon, who was the former head of the Department of Surgery, Patna Medical College and Hospital and a former president of the Association of Surgeons of India (Bihar chapter). The Government of India conferred Padma Shri, the fourth highest Indian civilian award, upon him in 2015, for his contributions to the field of medicine. Prasad had graduated in medicine from Patna Medical College and passed FRCS in 1962.
