= Frank Heath (educationist) =

British educationist (1863–1946)

Sir Frank Heath GBE KCB
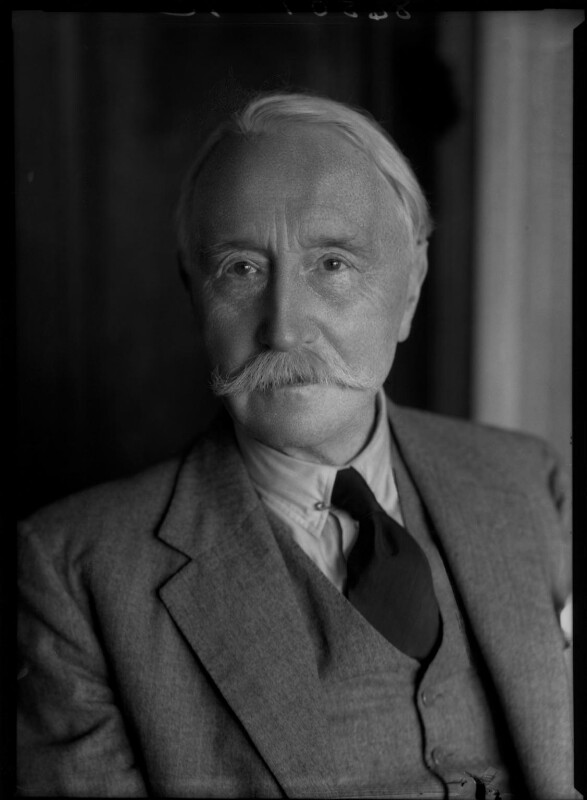
- Heath in 1938

Sir Henry Frank Heath (11 December 1863 – 5 October 1946) was a British educationist and civil servant.

He was the eldest son of Henry Charles Heath, miniature painter to Queen Victoria. He was educated at Westminster School and University College, London, after which he spent a year at the University of Strasbourg. When he came back to England he was appointed Professor of English at Bedford College, London (now Royal Holloway, University of London), and lecturer in English language and literature at King's College, London.

He held these posts until 1895, when he became assistant registrar and librarian of the University of London. He was appointed academic registrar in 1901, holding the post only for two years, when he joined the Government service as Director of Special Enquiries and Reports in the Board of Education (1903–16). He became principal assistant secretary of the Universities Branch of the Board from 1910 until he was appointed secretary to the department of Scientific and Industrial Research in 1916. He retired from the Department in 1927.

He was appointed Knight Commander of the Most Honourable Order of the Bath in 1917 and Knight Grand Cross of the Most Excellent Order of the British Empire in 1927.
