= Wilfred Kissack =

Anglican priest

The Ven. Wilfrid Langton Kissack (9 October 1873 in Isle of Man – 24 August 1942 in Georgetown, Guyana) was an Anglican priest in the Caribbean in the first half of the 20th century.

Kissack was educated at Emmanuel College, Cambridge. He was ordained in 1898. After curacies at New Milverton ( a suburb of Leamington Spa) and Bowes Park he went out to South America. He held incumbencies in Paramaribo, Vreed en Hoop and Georgetown. He was Archdeacon of Demerara from 1927 until his death.
