= George Walter Grabham =

British geologist (1882–1955)

George Walter Grabham MA (1903) OBE FRSE FGS (1882–1955) was a British-Portuguese geologist strongly linked to the Sudan in Africa.

== Life ==
Grabham was born on the island of Madeira in the Atlantic Ocean on 28 June 1882. He was the son of Dr Michael Comport Grabham (1840-1935) and his wife, Mary Ann Blandy (1843-1913).

He studied at University College School in London, then studied Geology at Cambridge University graduating MA in 1903. He immediately began working for HM Geological Survey in Scotland under Ben Peach. He resigned from the survey in 1906. In 1907 he took a post as Government Geologist to the Sudan mainly concerning water supply and irrigation. In 1934 he was promoted to Geological Advisor.

Grabham was elected a Fellow of the Royal Society of Edinburgh in 1926. His proposers were Ben Peach, John Horne, Thomas James Jehu and Robert Campbell. From 1911 to 1937 he sent geological items to the British Museum collected in the Sudan.

He retired in 1939 but remained in Africa.

Grabham died on 29 January 1955 at Burri village near Khartoum in the Sudan.

== Publications ==
- Edinburgh (1910)
- Glasgow (1911)
- Knapdale (1911)
- Hints on Collecting Geological Information and Specimens (1913)
- Ben Nevis (1916)
- Mission to Lake Tana 1920-21 (1925)
- Water Supplies in The Sudan (1934)
- Esboço da Formação Geológica da Madeira (1948)

== Awards ==
- Order of Medjidie
- Order of the Nile
