= 2013 Malaysian general election =

- 5 May 2013

All 222 seats in the Dewan Rakyat 112 seats needed for a majority
- Registered: 13,268,002 (▲21.47%)
- Turnout: 84.84% (▲8.85pp)
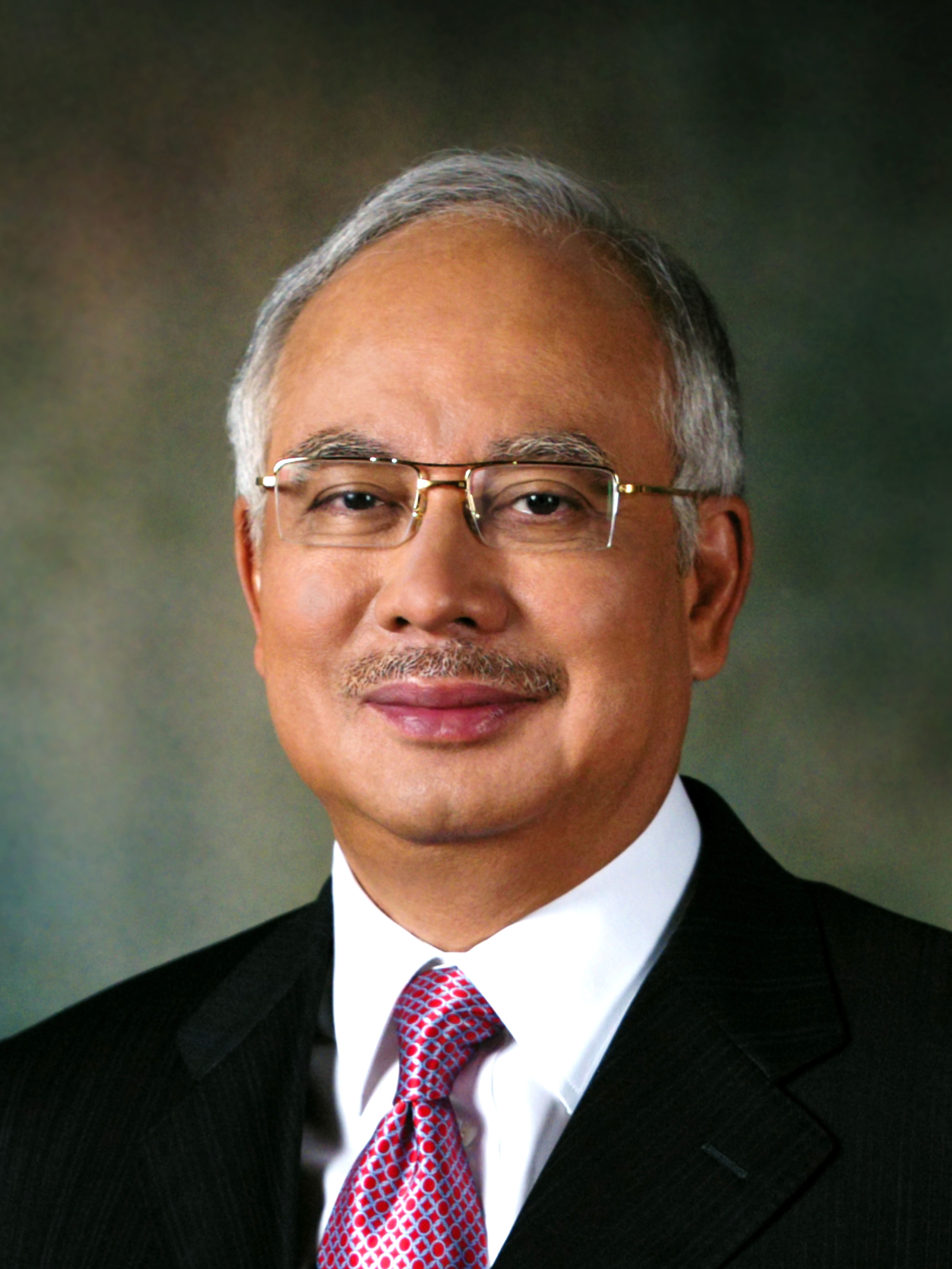

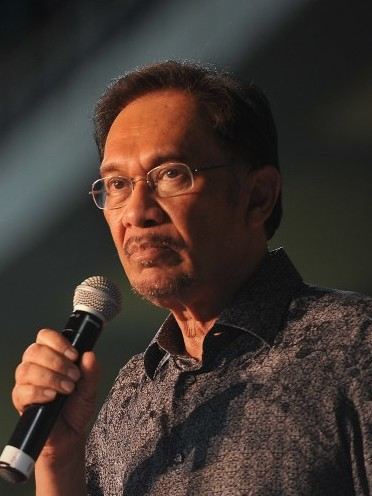
	First party	Second party
Leader	Najib Razak	Anwar Ibrahim
Party	UMNO	PKR
Alliance	Barisan Nasional	Pakatan Rakyat
Last election	50.99%, 138 seats (Note: Excludes Sabah Progressive Party, which was part of the coalition in the 2008 election but subsequently left the coalition after the election. The original number of seats and vote share held by Barisan Nasional as it was in 2008 was 140 seats and 51.38%, respectively.)	47.43%, 82 seats
Seats won	133	89
Seat change	▼5	▲7
Popular vote	5,237,678	5,624,319
Percentage	47.38%	50.88%
Swing	▼3.61pp	▲3.45pp
- Results by constituency
Prime Minister before election
Najib Razak
BN
Prime Minister-designate
Najib Razak
BN

General elections were held in Malaysia on Sunday, 5 May 2013. Voting took place in all 222 parliamentary constituencies, each electing one MP to the Dewan Rakyat, the dominant house of Parliament. State elections also took place in 505 state constituencies in 12 of the 13 states (excluding Sarawak) on the same day. The elections were the first since Najib Razak became Prime Minister in 2009.

The unofficial opposition Pakatan Rakyat coalition led by Anwar Ibrahim received a majority of the vote, with its three member parties collectively receiving 50.9% of the vote. However, they won only 89 of the 222 seats. The incumbent governing alliance, Barisan Nasional, received 47.4% of the vote and won 133 seats, giving Najib a second term in office. This was at the time the best performance by the opposition against the Barisan Nasional and the first time Barisan Nasional had not received the most votes in a general election.

Because Barisan Nasional won a majority despite receiving fewer votes than the opposition, the elections were followed by protests and accusations of gerrymandering.

== Background ==
The Malaysian Parliament was dissolved on 3 April 2013 by Tuanku Abdul Halim, the Yang di-Pertuan Agong on the advice of the Prime Minister of Malaysia, Najib Tun Razak. The Prime Minister made a televised statement announcing the dissolution of the 12th Parliament at 11:30 am local time the same day. Following the dissolution of Parliament, a general election was required to be held within 60 days, between 3 April and 2 June 2013, with the date to be decided by the Election Commission.

On 10 April 2013 the Election Commission of Malaysia announced that nominations for election candidates would be held on 20 April, with the general election set for 5 May. The early voting date of 30 April was also announced by the Election Commission. Official campaigning began on 20 April, which allowed for a 15-day campaigning period. Postal voting for eligible overseas Malaysians was announced to happen on 28 April 2013. Malaysian representative offices would open on that day for this purpose from 9 am to 6 pm local time. Offices in London and Melbourne would close at 8 pm instead, for the number of postal voters registered in those cities exceeded 1,000.

=== Dissolution of state legislative assemblies ===
In accordance with Malaysian law, the parliament as well as the legislative assemblies of each state (Dewan Undangan Negeri) would automatically dissolve on the fifth anniversary of the first sitting, and elections must be held within sixty days of the dissolution, unless dissolved prior to that date by their respective Heads of State on the advice of their Heads of Government.

On 28 March 2013 the Negeri Sembilan Legislative Assembly became the first state assembly to dissolve automatically in Malaysian history. The state government would remain in place as a caretaker government and assembly members' constituency offices would remain open to serve the constituencies' needs.

Following the dissolution of the Federal Parliament, state assemblies that had yet to be dissolved announced their dissolution in quick succession. Below are the dates of which the legislative assemblies of each state were dissolved:

Date	End of term	States	Remarks
28 March	28 March	Negeri Sembilan	Dissolved automatically after expiry of 5-year term
3 April	26 April	Malacca	
3 April	24 April	Perak	
3 April	29 April	Sabah	
4 April	28 April	Kelantan	
4 April	7 April	Pahang	
4 April	22 April	Selangor	
4 April	5 May	Terengganu	
5 April	21 April	Johor	
5 April	2 May	Kedah	
5 April	2 May	Penang	
5 April	28 April	Perlis	

The Sarawak State Legislative Assembly was not dissolved as the last election had been held in 2011 and the term of the state assembly was due to end in 2016. Only parliamentary elections were held there.

== Electoral system ==
The 222 members of the Dewan Rakyat, the dominant house of Parliament, were elected in single-member constituencies using first-past-the-post voting. In the 2013 general election, 11.05 million people voted which was approximately 85 percent of registered voters in total, and it was the highest rate that Malaysia had ever gotten in their electoral history.

Malaysia does not practice compulsory voting and automatic voter registration. Although the age of majority in the country is 18, the voting age is 21. The election was conducted by the Election Commission of Malaysia.

== Political parties ==
Malaysia is one of the most ethnically diverse countries, with a majority Malay population in addition to Chinese and Indian minorities, so the political parties are also diverse. Parties engage ethnic divisions, and conflicts over power play out between political parties that represent specific ethnic groups. According to the author Lim Hong Hai, writing in 2002, "over 80 per cent of Malaysia's population of over 23 million is found in Peninsular Malaysia, where the Malays form the largest ethnic group followed by the Chinese and Indians. All these ethnic groups are minorities in Sabah and Sarawak, where native ethnic groups other than the Malays make up about 60 per cent and 50 per cent of the population, respectively".

The Federation of Malaya was composed of 11 states in the Malay Peninsula that gained independence from Britain in 1957, and two states from the Borneo Island, Sabah and Sarawak which became members of the Federation of Malaya in 1963.

=== Barisan Nasional ===
The ruling Barisan Nasional (BN) alliance consists of 13 parties and had 137 seats in the parliament prior to the elections. BN had dominated the political framework and easily won each election since the first national vote in 1959.

The incumbent Barisan Nasional coalition returned to power in the 2008 general elections with 140 seats. The opposition parties that would later form the Pakatan Rakyat coalition won a total of 82 seats, thereby denying the BN its two-thirds majority which is required to pass amendments to the Federal Constitution.

Following their losses, then Prime Minister Abdullah Ahmad Badawi announced on 8 October 2008 that he was stepping down, resigning his post as United Malays National Organisation (UMNO) party leader. A leadership election was held on 26 March 2009, where then Deputy Prime Minister and Prime Minister-designate Najib Tun Razak was elected unopposed as the UMNO party leader. On 2 April 2009, Prime Minister Abdullah tendered his resignation to the Tuanku Mizan Zainal Abidin (who was the Yang di-Pertuan Agong) which was consented. On 3 April 2009, Prime Minister Najib Tun Razak was sworn in as the sixth Prime Minister of Malaysia at the Istana Negara, Kuala Lumpur, Malaysia in front of Tuanku Mizan Zainal Abidin.

=== Pakatan Rakyat ===
Pakatan Rakyat (PR) had 76 seats in the outgoing parliament and was composed of three large parties. Pakatan Rakyat gained control of five out of thirteen state assemblies (has since lost state assembly to BN due to defection in Perak) and 10 of the 11 parliamentary seats in the Federal Territory of Kuala Lumpur.

Former Deputy Prime Minister of Malaysia and the Leader of the Opposition Anwar Ibrahim, also the head of Pakatan Rakyat was returned to parliament after a ten-year absence following his victory in the Permatang Pauh by-election. The by-election was triggered when his wife Wan Azizah Wan Ismail resigned from her Permatang Pauh parliamentary seat, allowing Anwar to contest the seat and subsequently return to parliament.

== Campaign ==
Even before the dissolution of Parliament, both the incumbent BN and Pakatan Rakyat brought up a number of issues and incentives to be given to the Malaysian electorate to gain a decisive advantage during the election. Both coalitions released separate election manifestos dealing with issues such as minimum wage, taxation, assistance to small-medium industries, racial relations and financial assistance to the poor. The 2013 elections also saw a number of new measures introduced that are intended to improve the electoral process.

=== Election firsts ===
Since the 2008 general election a Parliament Select Committee was formed to make recommendations to improve the country's electoral process. The general election in 2013 brought about the introduction of Indelible ink to prevent voters from voting more than once. The indelible ink was mooted for use during the elections in 2008 but was scrapped by the Election Commission at the last minute. However, it was a source of controversy as reports of voters claiming that the indelible ink could be easily washed off were circulated in the media.

There was also advanced voting for civil servants and military personnel in place of postal voting. This was partly in response to protests by election watchdog groups and opposition parties that the previous voting procedures were not transparent and prone to manipulation.

The Election Commission introduced for the first time postal voting for Malaysians who resided overseas. However, these came with conditions, among them being that overseas Malaysians have to have been in Malaysia a number of times in the last five years. Overseas Malaysians residing in Singapore, southern Thailand, Brunei or Kalimantan in Indonesia were also not qualified to register as postal voters but had to return to their constituency if they were to cast their ballots.

The EC also permitted the disabled to bring along an assistant into the polling booth to aid them in the voting process.

=== Barisan Nasional ===
When Najib took over from Abdullah Badawi, he began enlarging the budget of the Prime Minister's Department, where he appointed Koh Tsu Koon to be in charge of the Government Transformation Programme (GTP), which includes monitoring the performance of ministries and six national key result areas (NKRAs) through Key Performance Indicators (KPIs). He also appointed the former CEO of Malaysia Airlines Idris Jala to help monitor the implementation of the KPIs in the form of the government's Performance Management and Delivery Unit (Pemandu).

Najib's administration also introduced the slogan 1Malaysia in which he called for the embracing all Malaysians of various ethnic groups, national unity and efficient governance. This became public policy, involving various initiatives like the introduction of Kedai Rakyat 1Malaysia's discount grocery stores to help the poor, 1Malaysia clinics providing free basic medical services and free email accounts (1Malaysia Email) for the Malaysian populace. His administration also began the distribution of financial aid to Malaysian households earning less than RM3,000 called 1Malaysia People's Aid or Bantuan Rakyat 1Malaysia (BR1M). A second round of BR1M financial allocations were made out in February 2013 totalling RM2.6 billion.

Another issue that arose was UMNO endorsing controversial candidates from the Malay right-wing group Perkasa to contest in the upcoming elections such as Zulkifli Noordin and Ibrahim Ali. Although Ibrahim Ali contested the Pasir Mas parliamentary seat as an independent candidate, the BN candidate who was supposed to challenge Ibrahim Ali did not file his nomination papers. The Pasir Mas parliamentary seat was the only seat without a BN candidate in this election.

During the election campaign, Muhyiddin Yassin, the incumbent Deputy Prime Minister had called for Malay Muslims to fight the alleged spread of LGBT movements and freedom of religion among the Malays. Furthermore, Najib has said that his government will defend the prohibition of the usage of the word 'Allah' by non-Muslims, which is currently being challenged in court.

==== BN manifesto ====
The national BN manifesto pledges the following commitments to be realised within the next five years if and when they secure a mandate to form the next Malaysian government:

Cost of Living
1. Increasing financial assistance BR1M 2015 online to RM1200 for households and RM600 for singles annually
2. Increasing 1Malaysia Book Vouchers to RM300 and Schooling Aid to RM150
3. Gradually reduce car prices by 20–30%
4. Increase the competitiveness of national cars
5. Increase the number of Kedai Rakyat 1Malaysia
6. Introduce 1Malaysia products in petrol stations and hypermarkets
7. Open 1Malaysia clinics in high density housing communities
8. Set up more 1Malaysia Day Care Centers
9. Lower broadband fees by at least 20% with guaranteed bandwidth
10. Introduce a 1Country 1Price policy for essential goods
11. Introduce more 1Malaysia products
Urban Well-being
1. Set up a new Ministry to address urban economic and social challenges
2. Increase representation of NGOs and civil society in local government
3. Rehabilitate low cost houses and flats in cities
4. Undertake the maintenance of public housing infrastructure
5. Provide quality public housing, catering to the needs of the younger generation
6. Provide recreational areas and facilities in urban centres
7. Ensure sufficient educational, training and healthcare services and facilities
8. Improve the transport links between urban centres and their surrounds
9. Open more temporary shelters for the homeless in high demand areas
Affordable & Secure Housing
1. Build 1,000,000 affordable homes including 500,000 PR1MA houses
2. Pricing PR1MA houses at 20% below market prices or cheaper
3. Introduce a lease and own scheme for Government housing projects
4. Revive abandoned housing projects
5. Assist poor home owners to rehabilitate their houses
6. Replace squatter settlements with permanent housing
7. Improve housing in estates and providing houses for former estate workers
8. Abolish stamping fees for first home purchases below RM400,000
Quality Health Services
1. Provide every Malaysian with access to quality healthcare
2. Establish a Heart Centre and Cancer Centre in 6 locations (4 in Peninsular Malaysia, 1 each for Sabah and Sarawak)
3. Provide public facilities for dialysis treatment in every high-density area
4. Provide discounted prices of specific medications for Malaysians with special needs
5. Introduce a support system for palliative home care for the aged and terminally ill
Public Transportation
1. Expand the Rapid Bus System to every state capital, with facilities for the aged and disabled
2. Continue expansion of rail systems
3. Build integrated bus, rail and taxi terminals in all towns and cities
4. Re-route buses to ensure more efficient and accessible services
5. Increase individual taxi permits
6. Implement a national high-speed rail and expand the double-tracked railway system
Infrastructure Development & Rural Transformation
1. Rapidly expand the North-South Expressway with more lands and exits
2. Build a Pan Borneo Highway from Semantan, Sarawak to Serudung, Sabah
3. Extend the East Coast Highway from Kuala Krai – Kota Bharu & Gambang – Segamat
4. Build a West Coast Highway from Banting to Taiping
5. Reduce intra-city tolls
6. Implement the 21st Century Village concept
7. Build more paved roads (6,300 km in Peninsular Malaysia, 2,500 km in Sabah and 2,800 km in Sarawak)
8. Solve the water supply problems in Selangor, Kuala Lumpur and Kelantan
9. Extend supply of clean water to another 320,000 homes
10. Expand electricity supply to another 146,000 homes
11. Compel service providers to ensure quality mobile phone services
Economy
1. Attract RM1.3 trillion of investments
2. Create 3.3 million new jobs, two million of which will be in high-income sectors
3. Build towards a per capita income of US$15,000 by year 2020
4. Provide special incentives for innovative and creative ventures
5. Implement policies that are fair and equitable to all races in Malaysia
6. Enhance the effectiveness of the Bumiputra agenda
7. Allocate more land and increase productivity of land for food and livestock production
8. Reform the tax structure to reduce personal and corporate tax
9. Continue special funding exceeding 20% of oil and gas revenue to oil and gas producing states
10. Establish a National Trading Company to source overseas markets for SME products
11. Create & promote more global and regional champions
12. Divesting non-strategic GLCs and increasing outsourcing programmes for Bumiputra companies
13. Provide RM500 million in seed funds to increase the equity of the Indian community to at least 3%
14. Set up a special unit to ensure successful implementation of policies for the Indian community
15. Increase access to microcredit for all Malaysians, including RM100 million for hawkers and petty traders
Educational Excellence
1. Bring Malaysia into the "top third category" of the best education systems in the world
2. Improve the command of Bahasa Malaysia and English among students
3. Make English a compulsory SPM pass subject
4. Improve access to quality education for rural and minority communities
5. Provide more merit-based scholarships
6. Continue special allocations to all types of schools
7. Expand Single Session Schooling
8. Revamp Teacher Training Colleges & raise the qualification bar for trainee teachers
9. Introduce a simplified teaching and learning system for Bahasa Malaysia in Chinese and Tamil schools
10. Build more schools of all types
11. Enhance performance in Mathematics and Science
12. Provide financial incentives of RM100,000 for schools with classes for special needs children
13. Convert SJKTs that wish to change status into fully aided schools
14. Set up ICT labs in all schools that require them
15. Transform vocational schools into colleges and increase enrolment to 20% of student population
16. Expand pre-school education to cover all types of schools
17. Provide new career pathways for fast tracking promotion of 420,000 teachers
18. Provide free WiFi on all public institution campuses
19. Introduce a laptop ownership scheme in schools
Security & Public Safety
1. Add four thousand police personnel per year
2. Strengthen the Motorcycle Patrol Unit by 5000 vehicles
3. Enhance the total capability of the Armed Forces
4. Strengthen the Police Commission
5. Use the 6P system to curb the influx of illegal foreigners
6. Create the SafeCam Programme to link up private and public CCTV systems
7. Expansion of CCTV monitoring for high traffic public areas
8. Introduce security initiatives in public housing schemes
9. Enrol an additional 50,000 Police Volunteer Reserves
Women's Participation
1. Increase the number of women in national decision-making
2. Promote gender equality
3. Provide more business and income opportunities for women
4. Create for incentives for work-from-home initiatives
5. Open 1Malaysia Daycare centres in all GLCs and Government Offices
6. Tighten laws regarding sexual abuse and harassment in homes and at work
Youth
1. Provide funding, training and incentives for youth-centric commercial ventures
2. Provide commercial space for youths to exhibit & market creative products and services
3. Establish incubators to nurture leadership and creativity
4. Provide more free WiFi hotspots in rural and semi-urban areas
5. Produce more high performance athletes & promoting a healthy lifestyle
6. Revisit laws pertaining to entertainment to promote performing arts & culture
Social Safety Nets
1. Streamline and improve safety net assistance
2. Provide financial assistance & educational opportunities for lower income earners
3. Turn Brickfields into a blind-friendly zone
4. Set up special courts to deal with Native Customary Rights (NCR) issues
5. Gazette all native customary land in consultation with State Governments
6. Provide more income generating opportunities within indigenous communities
7. Provide funds for registered NGOs and Civil Society Movements
Upholding Islam, Respecting Religious Freedom & Harmony
1. Uphold Islam as the religion of the Federation
2. Promote the Syiar & Syariat of Islam in accordance with the principles of Maqasia Syariah
3. Ensure other religions can be practised in peace and harmony
4. Assign jurisdiction over non-Muslim matters to a Minister
5. Practise moderation in all undertakings
6. Increase initiatives in uniting the ummah
7. Unlock income from developing wakaf land in co-operation with State Religious Authorities
8. Increase tax exemptions for contributions to construction, expansion and upkeep of places of worship
9. Continue to allocate land for building places of worship
10. Provide more financial assistance to religious institutions & places of worship
11. Improve the welfare of Imam, mosque officials & Guru-Guru Kafa
12. Upgrade the quality of and provide financial assistance to Sekolah Agama Rakyat
Fighting Corruption
1. Publicly disclose contracts to enhance transparency in Government procurement
2. Establish a Service Commission in MACC
3. Elevate the Head & Senior Officers of the MACC to a higher level
4. Give equal emphasis on investigations into bribe givers and receivers
5. Fast track access to the Auditor-General's Performance Audit Report
6. Establish additional special corruption Sessions and High Courts
7. Implement integrity pacts for MPs and State Assemblymen
Public Service & Governance
1. Introduce the Transformative Salary Scheme for civil servants
2. Include more opportunities for promotion and development in the civil service
3. Extend the tenure of contract officers and appointing them who are competent
4. Expand Urban Transformation Centres to all major cities and towns
5. Mobilize and empower the civil service
6. Improve counter services through appointment of multi-racial frontliners and expanding on-line services
7. Introduce recruitment programmes to ensure a fair mix of all races in civil service
8. Enhance the potential, capacity & capability of all civil servants
9. Give special attention to the disabled
A Global Movement of Moderates
1. Fight for the establishment of a Palestinian state
2. Support the realisation of ASEAN as an economic community by 2015
3. Vie for a non-permanent seat on the UN Security Council
4. Enhance economic & bilateral interests with major trading partners
5. Take the lead in fighting trans-national crimes
6. Spearhead humanitarian outreach programmes in conflict areas
Preserving Nature
1. Give financial incentives to ventures which invest in renewable green energy
2. Allocate more space for green lungs within major cities
3. Increase allocations and enact stricter laws to preserve rivers, forests and strategic conservation areas
4. Undertake reforestation programmes
5. Increase educational programmes to inculcate appreciation of the environment
6. Employ green and state of the art technologies in waste disposal & management

=== Pakatan Rakyat ===
The opposition Pakatan Rakyat (PR) has remain focused on the good governance of the Malaysian states (Kedah, Penang, Kelantan and Selangor) that they currently control despite not getting full assistance from the federal government One of the points they have made is the strong economic performance of the two states of Penang and Selangor which were reported in the media to have attracted higher business investments compared to other state governments with a BN majority. Some aspects of Pakatan's Election Manifesto is borrowed from their administrative masterplan Buku Jingga. In 2011, Penang and Selangor recorded a total of RM 17.8 billion in investments in the manufacturing sector, slightly more than 30% of the national share.

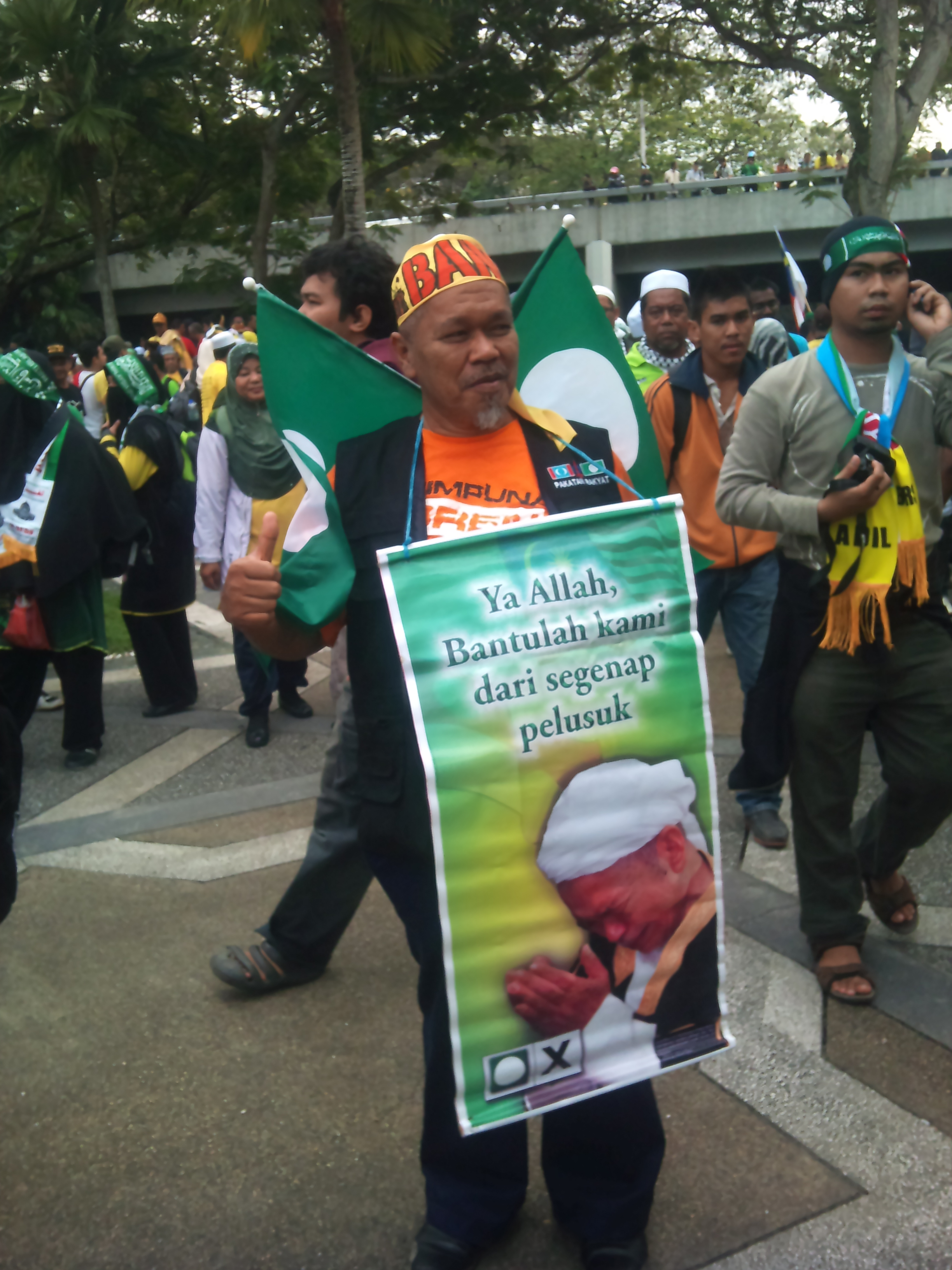
A PAS supporter at a rally calling for the removal of unfair government policies at the Himpunan Kebangkitan Rakyat, January 2013

PR announced its intention to replace the criticised New Economic Policy which they claim was discriminatory and only benefited certain groups of people, such as UMNO-connected individuals. Another main election promise they brought up was to cut the amount of spending wastages and the usage of direct aid to pay for social causes and provide free education around the country. One of the other issues is the Pakatan Rakyat's tussle for control of water company Syabas with the federal government, which has allegedly been mismanaging their operations. They have promised to give free water for the poor and unfortunate in the state of Selangor.

PR also promised to close down the Lynas Advance Materials Plant situated in Kuantan, Pahang if it is deemed unsafe. This received the support of Himpunan Hijau, the green movement opposed to the operations of the Lynas plant, whose chairman, Wong Tack will be contesting in the elections under the DAP banner.

PR also promised to increase the petroleum royalty payments from national oil company Petronas to petroleum-producing states (Pahang, Kelantan, Terengganu, Sabah and Sarawak) in Malaysia, irrespective of the party that forms the next state government.

On 13 April 2013, the Registrar of Societies (ROS) sent a letter to DAP, that due to technical glitches in the party polls, several of DAP's members were requested to attend an inquiry on 18 April 2013. This could have endangered DAP's chance to contest in the general election due to fears that the party might be deregistered. DAP had mulled the intention for their candidates to contest under the banner of PKR and PAS, butreceived assurance from the ROS that their symbol could be used legally during the general elections.

In Sarawak, opposition party DAP had put up election billboards highlighting the issue of murdered Mongolian Altantuyaa Sharibuu, but these billboards were torn down by enforcement officers. Following protests made by local DAP members, it was explained that the election billboards were removed as it depicted a person who was not contesting in the elections.

==== PR manifesto ====
The national PR manifesto has outlined the actions they will take if they form the next Malaysian government.

The Fraternity of the People
1. Eliminate discrimination
2. Respect the position of Islam as the official religion, while guaranteeing the freedom of other religions
3. Elevate culture as the positive foundation of community living
4. Raise from 5% to 20% the royalty payments for oil- and gas-producing states
5. Set up a contribution fund for married women, with the government contributing RM50 per month and their husbands contributing RM10 – RM100 per month
6. Provide a bonus of RM1,000 annually to each senior citizen aged 60 and above
7. Allocate RM220 million annually to 1,854 Sekolah Janaan Rakyat
8. Recognize the Unified Examination Certificate (UEC) for admission to tertiary education and as academic qualification for jobs
9. Restore the autonomy of Sabah and Sarawak in accordance with the provision of the Federal Constitution
10. Ensure equitable power-sharing between Sabah, Sarawak and Peninsular Malaysia
11. Cleanup of the citizenship registry list and curb the granting of false citizenships
12. Set up a Land Commission to investigate, resolve disputes, rejuvenate, study and restore Native Customary Rights to their rightful owners
13. Affirm the appointment of Sabahans and Sarawakians to hold offices in the Government
14. Raise the level of infrastructure development in Sabah and Sarawak
15. Reserve 141,000 ha of Orang Asli land to be returned to them
16. Supply clean water and electricity to 852 Orang Asli settlements
17. Award a total of 5,000 educational scholarships to Orang Asli children

The following actions have been pledged to be implemented immediately, in accordance with the Kuching Declaration:

- Eliminate the cabotage system that increases the price of household goods in Sabah and Sarawak
- Create investment incentives conditional upon the creation of job opportunities in Sabah and Sarawak
- Establishing two tier-2 oil companies owned by the Governments of Sabah and Sarawak that will join the country's oil and gas industry
- Initiate the construction of highways across Sabah and Sarawak which will connect Kuching to Kota Kinabalu and Kudat
- Halt the construction of dams that destroy the environment and displace the local population from their homes
The People's Economy
1. Provide one million job opportunities for the people within five years via progressive reduction of foreign workers
2. Introduce a minimum wage scheme of RM1,100 per month
3. Allocate RM2 billion for automation incentives and grants to eligible companies to facilitate implementation of minimum wage scheme
4. Train one million school leavers without higher education under the People's Pioneer Scheme
5. Set up five technical universities within ten years
6. Build twenty-five new vocational schools throughout the country
7. Set up a Royal Commission to study the overall improvement of the education system
8. Abolish all laws which are biased and oppressive to the working class
9. Provide funding to cultivate a smart partnership of trade unions, employees and employers
10. Set up a National Innovation Fund totalling RM500 million
11. Reshuffle tax incentives to shift the focus of assistance from large industries to SMIs
12. Revamp the 26% personal income tax bracket to affect individuals earning more than RM400,000 instead of the current RM250,000
13. Halt operations of the Lynas rare earth plant in Gebeng, Pahang
14. Review the implementation phases of the RAPID project in Pengerang
15. Reform all existing legislation related to logging, and regulate logging activities
16. Allocate RM500 million to assist participation of ex-soldiers in economic activities
17. Increase the government contribution to the Armed Forces Fund Board (AFFB) from 15% to 20%
18. Introduce a Soldiers' Dividend which will remunerate non-pensionable veterans to the amount of RM2,000 per year
19. Introduce individual taxi permits
20. Train taxi entrepreneurs in customer service and business skills
21. Provide fuel subsidies to taxi entrepreneurs
22. Expand the scope of permitted investments and grants under the existing Petroleum Fund
23. Provide tax relief for goods or services derived from R&D in universities or public research centres
24. Provide tax relief in the form of investment incentives and tax relief for research centres and researchers brought in
25. Provide investment incentives for successfully commercialised Malaysian R&D products
26. Make public transport free for differently abled people
27. Remodel the planning of the Klang Valley public transportation system to an integrated plan involving MRT and buses to improve the existing network and access
28. Examine each contract awarded in the MRT package in light of updated legislation
29. Invest an additional RM2 billion in the first year to double the number of buses and bus routes in the Klang Valley
30. Initiate steps towards building the first inter-city high-speed rail system in Southeast Asia
31. Establish an Anti-Monopoly Commission and amend existing laws relating to competition
32. Establish a Public Contracts Commission
33. Dissolve 1MDB so that Khazanah remains the only state investment body
34. Disposal and handover of government holdings in government-linked companies (GLCs) which are not involved in businesses of national importance
35. Restructure the role of Ekuinas so that the agency assists in the takeover of GLCs by the management and qualified entrepreneurs
36. Ensure overall implementation of procurement by open tender in the management of public entities
The People's Well-Being
1. Distribute gains from the extra oil revenue profit by lowering petrol and diesel prices.
2. Channel RM25 billion from gas company subsidies directly to the people via reduced electricity tariffs
3. Discontinue private water management concessions that have resulted in high water tariffs
4. Take over management of highways with the intention of gradually abolishing tolls
5. Lower the car excise tax in stages with the intention of abolishing it in 5 years' time
6. Liberalise the national automotive industry
7. Build 150,000 low- and medium- cost homes within the first term of administration
8. Invest RM 5 billion in the first year for affordable housing, followed by RM 2 billion for the following years
9. Provide free higher education in all public institutions, and subsidise fees for students in private institutions
10. Provide a living cost allowance for students who are not financially well-off
11. Stop implementation of Automatic Enforcement System (AES) for road users and rescind all AES summonses
12. Review all compensation claims as a result of the GER manipulation and pay appropriate compensation to affected FELDA settlers.
13. Increase police personnel's remuneration by 15% in stages
14. Increase personnel strength of the Crime Investigation Department (CID)
15. Allocate an additional of RM 50 million a year to build police posts in places of high public concentration
16. Allocate a further RM 200 million a year to increase the police's capabilities and effectiveness in forensic investigation.
17. Reject all attempts to introduce a healthcare tax
18. Ensure free healthcare for all Malaysians through government hospitals while incentivising the private sector to provide healthcare services at a reasonable rate
19. Abolish fees for Class 2 and Class 3 wards.
20. Abolish monopolies on pharmaceutical supplies, hospital construction, and medical infrastructure
21. Improve specialist treatments to the low-income group for complicated surgeries
22. Fulfill the target of one doctor to 550 citizens in the first term of administration
23. Increase welfare assistance from RM300 a month to RM500 a month
24. Establish a National Commodity Fund to assist families affected by sudden drops in commodity prices
The People's Government
1. Add value to wakaf land that will generate economic welfare for the people
2. Target to double the current Tabung Haji fund amount within ten years of Pakatan Rakyat administration
3. Ensure that the right to religious freedom and religious practice for other religions will be upheld
4. Deploy a new remuneration package for civil servants that will factor excellent work performance, length of service and leadership qualities
5. Implement the 8 demands of BERSIH as electoral reform
6. Implement automatic voter registration upon reaching eligible voting age
7. Clean-up electoral roll within 100 days of coming to power
8. Reform the judiciary, Attorney General's Chambers, Malaysian Anti-Corruption Commission (MACC) and Royal Malaysian Police Force (PDRM)
9. Restore the powers and freedom of Parliament as the voice of the people
10. Introduce the parliamentary select committee system in crucial ministries
11. Abolish all legislation that restricts media freedom
12. Corporatise government-owned broadcasting institutions such as Radio Televisyen Malaysia (RTM)
13. Respect the maturity of media practitioners in operating the media industry
14. Abolish the Universities and Universities Colleges Act (UUCA) within 100 days of Pakatan Rakyat administration
15. Selection of vice-chancellor and rectors in public higher education institutions will be made by an independent evaluating committee
16. Perform a thorough review of all legislations that are in conflict with principles of justice for and freedom of the people and abolish them within the first year
17. Enforce a Democracy Restoration Act to further strengthen the basic rights of the people
18. Release and apologise to all Internal Security Act (ISA) detainees from the past to the present
19. Restructure MACC's power and leadership to rebuild its integrity
20. Restructure the practices and processes of MACC to focus on investigation and prosecution towards big corruption cases that involve the public interest
21. Tighten corruption-related legislation (including the Whistleblower Protection Act) to firmly implement anti-corruption laws

=== Third parties ===
The election also brought in the entry of many third parties that influenced the election outcome in many parliament and state seats. Indian-based party Human Rights Party Malaysia, which was instrumental in organising Indians in protests against the government such as Hindraf rally in 2007, contested in several seats in Peninsular Malaysia. Currently, there are two camps in Hindraf: one aligned to Barisan Nasional and another that is neutral. Borneo-based parties such as Sabah Progressive Party (SAPP) (a former BN coalition partner) and the State Reform Party (STAR) contested the election on their own after a breakdown in talks with PR in having one to one contests against BN. The entry of these parties have brought about multi-cornered fights in Sabah and Sarawak. One of the main issues they brought up was the increasing number of illegals in Sabah and of the Royal Commission of Inquiry on illegal immigrants in Sabah. Furthermore, SAPP and STAR are partners in the United Borneo Front which fights for the equal status of Sabah and Sarawak as stipulated in the Malaysia Agreement that was made in 1963.

=== Bersih factor ===
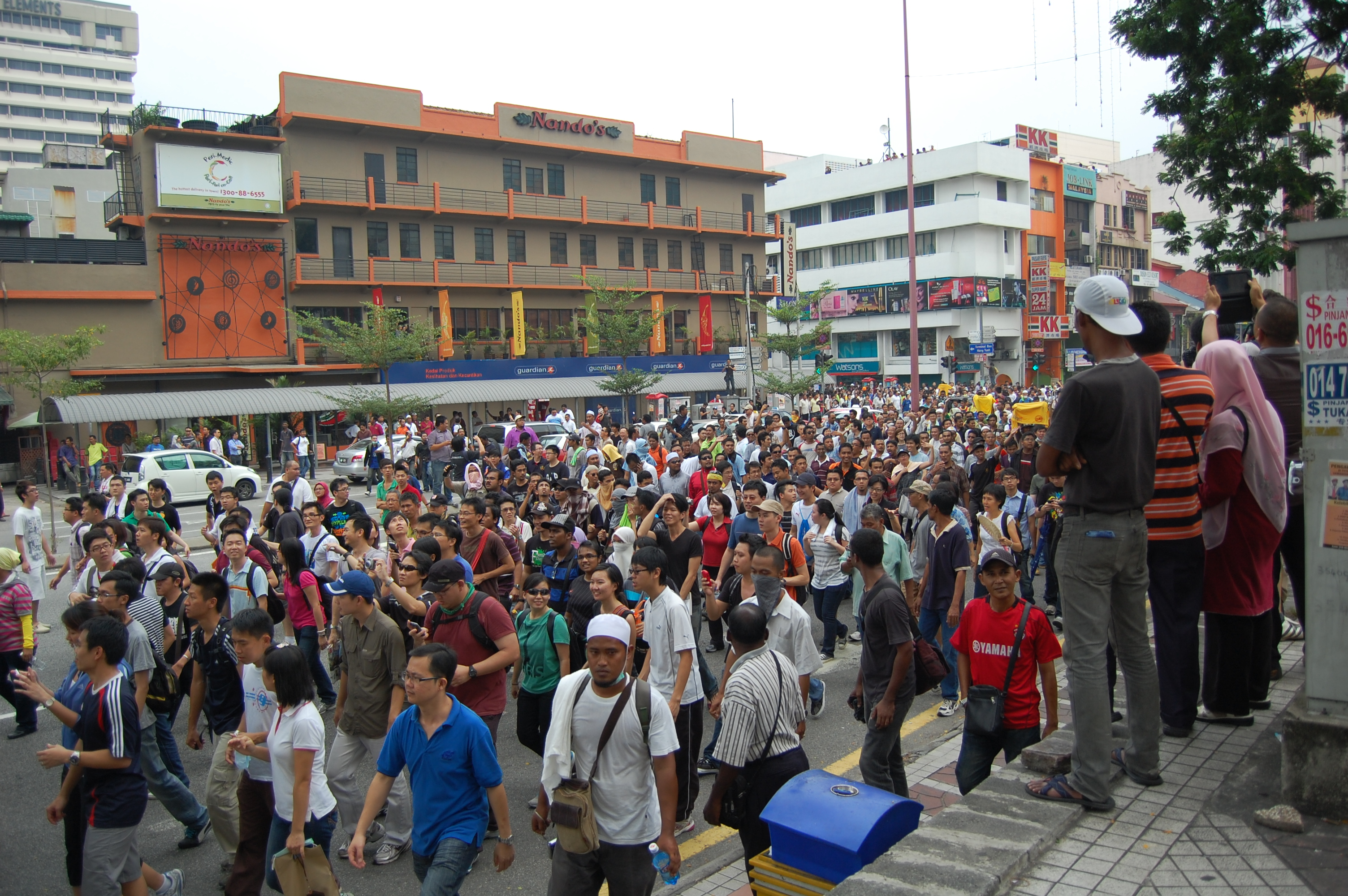
Bersih rally in KL in 2011 calling for electoral reforms

The election watchdog group Bersih will be a big factor in the elections as they were responsible for organising large rallies calling for the electoral reforms in Malaysia in 2011 and 2012. They have pointed out that the electoral roll was marred by irregularities such as gerrymandering, phantom voters, malapportionment and postal vote fraud. Bersih has also warned against politicians or groups that support intimidation and violence against the electorate. Bersih has added to its blacklist of politicians who perpetuate the cycle of political violence such as Home Minister Hishammuddin Hussein, Defence Minister Zahid Hamidi and BN candidate Hamidah Othman. Bersih has criticised both the BN-majority federal and PR-majority Selangor state caretaker governments for using government resources for election campaigning purposes.

=== Nominations ===
Nominations for candidates were made on 20 April 2013 between 9am and 10am. For the first time in Malaysian electoral history, all seats were contested and no candidate won a seat unopposed, with some candidates facing as many as 6 opponents.

There were 579 parliamentary candidates contesting for 222 parliamentary seats, and 1,322 candidates fighting for 505 state seats.

Party	Parliamentary seats contested	State assembly seats contested
BN	221	505
PAS	73	236
PKR	99	172
DAP	51	103
STAR	28	49
SAPP	8	41
BERJASA	9	5
KITA	2	11
BERSAMA	1	4
PCM	2	3
PSM	0	2
SWP	6	0
Independent	79	191
Total	579	1322

== Conduct ==
=== Incidents ===
During the first three days of the official campaigning period, a total of 387 incidents were reported, with no fewer than 15 people arrested by the police for investigation. On 23 April 2013 in Nibong Tebal, an Improvised Explosive Device (IED) exploded at the site of a BN rally, injuring one. The police subsequently discovered a second IED at the site, which was later safely detonated. Both the incumbent Prime Minister Najib Razak and opposition leader Anwar Ibrahim have condemned the violence. The bombings have also been condemned by Bersih who said that all politicians should condemn the violence regardless of party affiliation. Bersih has offered to monitor police reports made on political violence and incidents of electoral misconduct.

Opposition political gatherings were disrupted by bikers. On 24 April 2013, a press photographer was assaulted by bikers spotted wearing 1Malaysia shirts at a gathering by DAP in Bukit Gelugor. The state BN chief has denied any connection with the incident. Additionally, there have been numerous reports of vandalism against vehicles used by opposition politicians and their supporters. In one incident, two cars belonging to a PKR candidate's daughter were damaged following an arson attempt at her residence in Klang.

A number of sexually explicit videos allegedly portraying opposition figures have surfaced in cyberspace, notably on blogs hostile towards the Pakatan Rakyat. The secretary-general of PAS, Datuk Mustafa Ali, who was implicated in one of the videos has denied his involvement, with his lawyer calling the videos "a pure slander campaign by UMNO". In turn, UMNO has sued Mustafa and his lawyer over those allegedly libelous statements. Anwar Ibrahim has also sued UMNO blogger and election candidate Wan Muhammad Azri Wan Deris for trying to implicate him in one of the explicit videos.

A number of anti-Christian billboards have appeared during the election campaign period, bringing up the ire of the Christian Federation of Malaysia, who have called for the removal of such billboards.

Users of several online news and media websites, such as independent news site Malaysiakini have claimed that several Malaysian internet service providers (ISPs) were throttling their access speeds to the sites. Several independent websites critical of the government, such as Radio Free Malaysia and Sarawak Report have experienced DDoS attacks. Malaysiakini have claimed that their Twitter account was hacked and their videos inaccessible through local ISPs.

There have been a number of reports by the opposition alleging that the incumbent government is flying in thousands of foreigners to parts of Malaysia to influence the outcome of the vote in favour of BN. BN in turn has denied any wrongdoing, saying these flights were sponsored by "friends of BN". Bersih has called the provision of flights for voters an election offence. The opposition said that many of their supporters and agents will be monitoring the situation and making citizen's arrests of foreigners who vote.

=== Voting ===
Postal voting for overseas Malaysians were conducted in various Malaysian representative offices around the world. According to the Election Commission (EC), 70% of 8,756 people who were eligible to vote overseas turned up to vote despite some teething problems.

Early voting was conducted for military, police personnel and their spouses in 544 polling centres throughout Malaysia. It was estimated that there were 270,000 of these voters in total. There have been several reports regarding the usage of indelible ink for early voters, with some claiming that the ink could be easily washed off. The Election Commission has promised to conduct investigations on this issue after a number of reports lodged by several opposition parties. On 2 May 2013, the EC held a public demonstration on the application of indelible ink. During this demonstration, the stain left behind by the ink was attempted to be washed off using various means, but without success. Addressing the earlier claims and reports of the stain being easily removed, EC deputy chairman Datuk Wan Ahmad Wan Omar stated that this could be due to improper application procedures. He said that if the ink bottles were not thoroughly shook before use, the applied ink may contain insufficient quantities of silver nitrate, the compound used in the ink that leaves a permanent stain.

General voting began at 8.00 am on 5 May 2013 with a total of 13,268,002 Malaysians eligible to cast their ballots at 8,789 polling centres nationwide. Voter turnout is expected to be at an all-time high surpassing the 2008 election. As of 12 pm, 58.99% of voters have cast their ballots, nationwide. Voting closed at 5 pm however voters inside the polling stations were allowed to continue casting their ballots. Estimated turnout was 80%.

== Results ==
Equal-area representation of Parliament results with each hexagon representing one seat

Party or alliance		Votes	%	Seats	+/–
Pakatan Rakyat	People's Justice Party	2,232,618	20.20	29	–1
Pakatan Rakyat	Democratic Action Party	1,736,909	15.71	38	+10
Pakatan Rakyat	Pan-Malaysian Islamic Party	1,633,199	14.77	21	–2
Pakatan Rakyat	Socialist Party of Malaysia	21,593	0.20	1	0
Pakatan Rakyat	Total	5,624,319	50.88	89	+7
Barisan Nasional	United Malays National Organisation	3,242,037	29.33	88	+9
Barisan Nasional	Malaysian Chinese Association	881,766	7.98	7	–8
Barisan Nasional	Malaysian Indian Congress	251,004	2.27	4	+1
Barisan Nasional	Parti Pesaka Bumiputera Bersatu	232,390	2.10	14	0
Barisan Nasional	Parti Gerakan Rakyat Malaysia	210,773	1.91	1	–1
Barisan Nasional	Sarawak United Peoples' Party	133,603	1.21	1	–5
Barisan Nasional	United Sabah Party	74,959	0.68	4	+1
Barisan Nasional	UPKO	65,966	0.60	3	–1
Barisan Nasional	Parti Rakyat Sarawak	59,540	0.54	6	0
Barisan Nasional	Sarawak Progressive Democratic Party	55,505	0.50	4	0
Barisan Nasional	Liberal Democratic Party	13,138	0.12	0	–1
Barisan Nasional	Parti Bersatu Rakyat Sabah	9,467	0.09	1	0
Barisan Nasional	People's Progressive Party	7,530	0.07	0	0
Barisan Nasional	Total	5,237,678	47.38	133	–5
State Reform Party		45,386	0.41	0	New
Pan-Malaysian Islamic Front		31,835	0.29	0	New
Sarawak Workers Party		15,630	0.14	0	New
Sabah Progressive Party		10,099	0.09	0	–2
Love Malaysia Party		2,129	0.02	0	New
People's Welfare Party		623	0.01	0	New
Malaysian United People's Party		257	0.00	0	New
Independents		86,931	0.79	0	0
Total		11,054,887	100.00	222	0
Valid votes		11,054,887	98.45		
Invalid/blank votes		173,661	1.55		
Total votes		11,228,548	100.00		
Registered voters/turnout		13,268,002	84.63		
Source: ElectionData.MY

=== By state ===
==== Johor ====
Party or alliance		Votes	%	Seats	+/–
Barisan Nasional	United Malays National Organisation	518,952	37.96	15	-1
Barisan Nasional	Malaysian Chinese Association	192,043	14.05	4	-3
Barisan Nasional	Malaysian Indian Congress	20,037	1.47	1	0
Barisan Nasional	Parti Gerakan Rakyat Malaysia	19,754	1.45	1	0
Barisan Nasional	Total	750,786	54.92	21	-4
Pakatan Rakyat	People's Justice Party	284,777	20.83	1	+1
Pakatan Rakyat	Democratic Action Party	204,363	14.95	4	+3
Pakatan Rakyat	Pan-Malaysian Islamic Party	125,983	9.22	0	0
Pakatan Rakyat	Total	615,123	45.00	5	+4
Independents		1,033	0.08	0	0
Total		1,366,942	100.00	26	0
Valid votes		1,366,942	97.94		
Invalid/blank votes		28,821	2.06		
Total votes		1,395,763	100.00		
Registered voters/turnout		1,605,311	86.95		
Source: ElectionData.MY

==== Kedah ====
Party or alliance		Votes	%	Seats	+/–
Barisan Nasional	United Malays National Organisation	399,890	44.85	10	+7
Barisan Nasional	Malaysian Chinese Association	51,205	5.74	0	-1
Barisan Nasional	Total	451,095	50.60	10	+6
Pakatan Rakyat	People's Justice Party	217,452	24.39	4	-1
Pakatan Rakyat	Pan-Malaysian Islamic Party	214,547	24.06	1	-5
Pakatan Rakyat	Total	431,999	48.45	5	–6
Pan-Malaysian Islamic Front		6,160	0.69	0	New
Malaysian United People's Party		257	0.03	0	New
People's Welfare Party		200	0.02	0	New
Independents		1,864	0.21	0	0
Total		891,575	100.00	15	0
Valid votes		891,575	98.16		
Invalid/blank votes		16,745	1.84		
Total votes		908,320	100.00		
Registered voters/turnout		1,041,068	87.25		
Source: ElectionData.MY

==== Kelantan ====
Party or alliance		Votes	%	Seats	+/–
Pakatan Rakyat	Pan-Malaysian Islamic Party	340,016	44.20	9	0
Pakatan Rakyat	People's Justice Party	73,071	9.50	0	-3
Pakatan Rakyat	Total	413,087	53.70	9	–3
Barisan Nasional	United Malays National Organisation	330,382	42.95	5	+3
Independents		25,745	3.35	0	0
Total		769,214	100.00	14	0
Valid votes		769,214	98.32		
Invalid/blank votes		13,142	1.68		
Total votes		782,356	100.00		
Registered voters/turnout		918,573	85.17		
Source: ElectionData.MY

==== Kuala Lumpur ====
Party or alliance		Votes	%	Seats	+/–
Pakatan Rakyat	Democratic Action Party	229,377	34.87	5	0
Pakatan Rakyat	People's Justice Party	173,807	26.42	4	0
Pakatan Rakyat	Pan-Malaysian Islamic Party	22,168	3.37	0	-1
Pakatan Rakyat	Total	425,352	64.66	9	–1
Barisan Nasional	United Malays National Organisation	105,134	15.98	2	+1
Barisan Nasional	Malaysian Chinese Association	64,032	9.73	0	0
Barisan Nasional	Parti Gerakan Rakyat Malaysia	50,572	7.69	0	0
Barisan Nasional	People's Progressive Party	7,530	1.14	0	0
Barisan Nasional	Total	227,268	34.55	2	+1
Pan-Malaysian Islamic Front		949	0.14	0	New
Independents		4,281	0.65	0	0
Total		657,850	100.00	11	0
Valid votes		657,850	99.05		
Invalid/blank votes		6,278	0.95		
Total votes		664,128	100.00		
Registered voters/turnout		792,071	83.85		
Source: ElectionData.MY

==== Labuan ====
Party or alliance		Votes	%	Seats	+/–
Barisan Nasional	United Malays National Organisation	12,694	66.29	1	0
Pakatan Rakyat	People's Justice Party	6,069	31.69	0	0
Pakatan Rakyat	Pan-Malaysian Islamic Party	386	2.02	0	0
Pakatan Rakyat	Total	6,455	33.71	0	0
Total		19,149	100.00	1	0
Valid votes		19,149	98.82		
Invalid/blank votes		228	1.18		
Total votes		19,377	100.00		
Registered voters/turnout		24,474	79.17		
Source: ElectionData.MY

==== Malacca ====
Party or alliance		Votes	%	Seats	+/–
Barisan Nasional	United Malays National Organisation	141,516	37.53	3	-1
Barisan Nasional	Malaysian Chinese Association	61,369	16.28	1	0
Barisan Nasional	Total	202,885	53.81	4	-1
Pakatan Rakyat	People's Justice Party	92,165	24.44	1	+1
Pakatan Rakyat	Democratic Action Party	70,518	18.70	1	0
Pakatan Rakyat	Pan-Malaysian Islamic Party	11,488	3.05	0	0
Pakatan Rakyat	Total	173,981	46.14	2	+1
Total		377,056	100.00	6	0
Valid votes		377,056	98.15		
Invalid/blank votes		7,106	1.85		
Total votes		384,162	100.00		
Registered voters/turnout		439,040	87.50		
Source: ElectionData.MY

==== Negeri Sembilan ====
Party or alliance		Votes	%	Seats	+/–
Barisan Nasional	United Malays National Organisation	150,188	32.33	5	0
Barisan Nasional	Malaysian Chinese Association	58,246	12.54	0	0
Barisan Nasional	Malaysian Indian Congress	28,269	6.08	0	0
Barisan Nasional	Total	236,703	50.95	5	0
Pakatan Rakyat	Democratic Action Party	94,900	20.43	2	0
Pakatan Rakyat	People's Justice Party	69,390	14.93	1	0
Pakatan Rakyat	Pan-Malaysian Islamic Party	55,736	12.00	0	0
Pakatan Rakyat	Total	219,718	47.29	3	0
Pan-Malaysian Islamic Front		6,866	1.48	0	New
Independents		1,023	0.22	0	0
Total		464,618	100.00	8	0
Valid votes		464,618	97.82		
Invalid/blank votes		10,359	2.18		
Total votes		474,977	100.00		
Registered voters/turnout		555,982	85.43		
Source: ElectionData.MY

==== Pahang ====
Party or alliance		Votes	%	Seats	+/–
Barisan Nasional	United Malays National Organisation	280,542	45.86	8	-1
Barisan Nasional	Malaysian Chinese Association	46,548	7.61	1	-1
Barisan Nasional	Malaysian Indian Congress	10,506	1.72	1	0
Barisan Nasional	Total	337,596	55.18	10	-2
Pakatan Rakyat	People's Justice Party	107,641	17.60	2	0
Pakatan Rakyat	Pan-Malaysian Islamic Party	104,743	17.12	1	+1
Pakatan Rakyat	Democratic Action Party	59,027	9.65	1	+1
Pakatan Rakyat	Total	271,411	44.37	4	+2
Pan-Malaysian Islamic Front		912	0.15	0	New
Independents		1,847	0.30	0	0
Total		611,766	100.00	14	0
Valid votes		611,766	97.88		
Invalid/blank votes		13,260	2.12		
Total votes		625,026	100.00		
Registered voters/turnout		736,111	84.91		
Source: ElectionData.MY

==== Penang ====
Party or alliance		Votes	%	Seats	+/–
Pakatan Rakyat	Democratic Action Party	319,594	43.95	7	0
Pakatan Rakyat	People's Justice Party	131,430	18.07	3	-1
Pakatan Rakyat	Pan-Malaysian Islamic Party	42,303	5.82	0	0
Pakatan Rakyat	Total	493,327	67.84	10	–1
Barisan Nasional	United Malays National Organisation	118,613	16.31	3	+1
Barisan Nasional	Malaysian Chinese Association	62,969	8.66	0	0
Barisan Nasional	Parti Gerakan Rakyat Malaysia	47,813	6.57	0	0
Barisan Nasional	Total	229,395	31.54	3	+1
Love Malaysia Party		2,129	0.29	0	New
Independents		2,393	0.33	0	0
Total		727,244	100.00	13	0
Valid votes		727,244	98.60		
Invalid/blank votes		10,317	1.40		
Total votes		737,561	100.00		
Registered voters/turnout		846,232	87.16		
Source: ElectionData.MY

==== Perak ====
Party or alliance		Votes	%	Seats	+/–
Pakatan Rakyat	Democratic Action Party	261,752	22.94	7	+1
Pakatan Rakyat	People's Justice Party	222,480	19.50	2	0
Pakatan Rakyat	Pan-Malaysian Islamic Party	118,035	10.35	2	0
Pakatan Rakyat	Socialist Party of Malaysia	21,593	1.89	1	0
Pakatan Rakyat	Total	623,860	54.68	12	+1
Barisan Nasional	United Malays National Organisation	249,988	21.91	10	+2
Barisan Nasional	Malaysian Chinese Association	160,905	14.10	1	-2
Barisan Nasional	Parti Gerakan Rakyat Malaysia	62,498	5.48	0	-1
Barisan Nasional	Malaysian Indian Congress	39,470	3.46	1	0
Barisan Nasional	Total	512,861	44.95	12	-1
Pan-Malaysian Islamic Front		2,053	0.18	0	New
Independents		2,102	0.18	0	0
Total		1,140,876	100.00	24	0
Valid votes		1,140,876	97.99		
Invalid/blank votes		23,427	2.01		
Total votes		1,164,303	100.00		
Registered voters/turnout		1,406,734	82.77		
Source: ElectionData.MY

==== Perlis ====
Party or alliance		Votes	%	Seats	+/–
Barisan Nasional	United Malays National Organisation	64,192	55.36	3	0
Pakatan Rakyat	Pan-Malaysian Islamic Party	51,358	44.29	0	0
Independents		406	0.35	0	0
Total		115,956	100.00	3	0
Valid votes		115,956	98.26		
Invalid/blank votes		2,056	1.74		
Total votes		118,012	100.00		
Registered voters/turnout		137,057	86.10		
Source: ElectionData.MY

==== Putrajaya ====
Party or alliance		Votes	%	Seats	+/–
Barisan Nasional	United Malays National Organisation	9,943	69.31	1	0
Pakatan Rakyat	Pan-Malaysian Islamic Party	4,402	30.69	0	0
Total		14,345	100.00	1	0
Valid votes		14,345	99.17		
Invalid/blank votes		120	0.83		
Total votes		14,465	100.00		
Registered voters/turnout		15,791	91.60		
Source: ElectionData.MY

==== Sabah ====
Party or alliance		Votes	%	Seats	+/–
Barisan Nasional	United Malays National Organisation	258,298	33.52	14	+1
Barisan Nasional	United Sabah Party	74,959	9.73	4	+1
Barisan Nasional	UPKO	65,966	8.56	3	-1
Barisan Nasional	Liberal Democratic Party	13,138	1.71	0	-1
Barisan Nasional	Parti Bersatu Rakyat Sabah	9,467	1.23	1	0
Barisan Nasional	Total	421,828	54.75	22	0
Pakatan Rakyat	People's Justice Party	195,117	25.32	1	+1
Pakatan Rakyat	Democratic Action Party	64,103	8.32	2	+1
Pakatan Rakyat	Pan-Malaysian Islamic Party	18,191	2.36	0	0
Pakatan Rakyat	Total	277,411	36.01	3	+2
State Reform Party		43,010	5.58	0	New
Sabah Progressive Party		10,099	1.31	0	-2
People's Welfare Party		423	0.05	0	0
Independents		17,695	2.30	0	0
Total		770,466	100.00	25	0
Valid votes		770,466	97.51		
Invalid/blank votes		19,682	2.49		
Total votes		790,148	100.00		
Registered voters/turnout		981,814	80.48		
Source: ElectionData.MY

==== Sarawak ====
Party or alliance		Votes	%	Seats	+/–
Barisan Nasional	Parti Pesaka Bumiputera Bersatu	232,390	28.44	14	0
Barisan Nasional	Sarawak United Peoples' Party	133,603	16.35	1	-5
Barisan Nasional	Parti Rakyat Sarawak	59,540	7.29	6	0
Barisan Nasional	Sarawak Progressive Democratic Party	55,505	6.79	4	0
Barisan Nasional	Total	481,038	58.86	25	-5
Pakatan Rakyat	Democratic Action Party	179,973	22.02	5	+4
Pakatan Rakyat	People's Justice Party	105,117	12.86	1	+1
Pakatan Rakyat	Pan-Malaysian Islamic Party	19,418	2.38	0	0
Pakatan Rakyat	Total	304,508	37.26	6	+5
Sarawak Workers Party		15,630	1.91	0	New
State Reform Party		2,376	0.29	0	New
Independents		13,675	1.67	0	0
Total		817,227	100.00	31	0
Valid votes		817,227	98.59		
Invalid/blank votes		11,668	1.41		
Total votes		828,895	100.00		
Registered voters/turnout		1,083,972	76.47		
Source: ElectionData.MY

==== Selangor ====
Party or alliance		Votes	%	Seats	+/–
Pakatan Rakyat	People's Justice Party	520,883	29.60	9	0
Pakatan Rakyat	Pan-Malaysian Islamic Party	270,532	15.38	4	0
Pakatan Rakyat	Democratic Action Party	253,302	14.40	4	0
Pakatan Rakyat	Total	1,044,717	59.38	17	0
Barisan Nasional	United Malays National Organisation	318,250	18.09	4	0
Barisan Nasional	Malaysian Chinese Association	184,449	10.48	0	-1
Barisan Nasional	Malaysian Indian Congress	152,722	8.68	1	+1
Barisan Nasional	Parti Gerakan Rakyat Malaysia	30,136	1.71	0	0
Barisan Nasional	Total	685,557	38.96	5	0
Pan-Malaysian Islamic Front		14,895	0.85	0	New
Independents		14,301	0.81	0	0
Total		1,759,470	100.00	22	0
Valid votes		1,759,470	98.31		
Invalid/blank votes		30,310	1.69		
Total votes		1,789,780	100.00		
Registered voters/turnout		2,048,828	87.36		
Source: ElectionData.MY

==== Terengganu ====
Party or alliance		Votes	%	Seats	+/–
Barisan Nasional	United Malays National Organisation	283,455	51.43	4	-3
Pakatan Rakyat	Pan-Malaysian Islamic Party	233,893	42.44	4	+3
Pakatan Rakyat	People's Justice Party	33,219	6.03	0	0
Pakatan Rakyat	Total	267,112	48.47	4	+3
Independents		566	0.10	0	0
Total		551,133	100.00	8	0
Valid votes		551,133	98.54		
Invalid/blank votes		8,139	1.46		
Total votes		559,272	100.00		
Registered voters/turnout		634,944	88.08		
Source: ElectionData.MY

== Reactions, analysis and aftermath ==
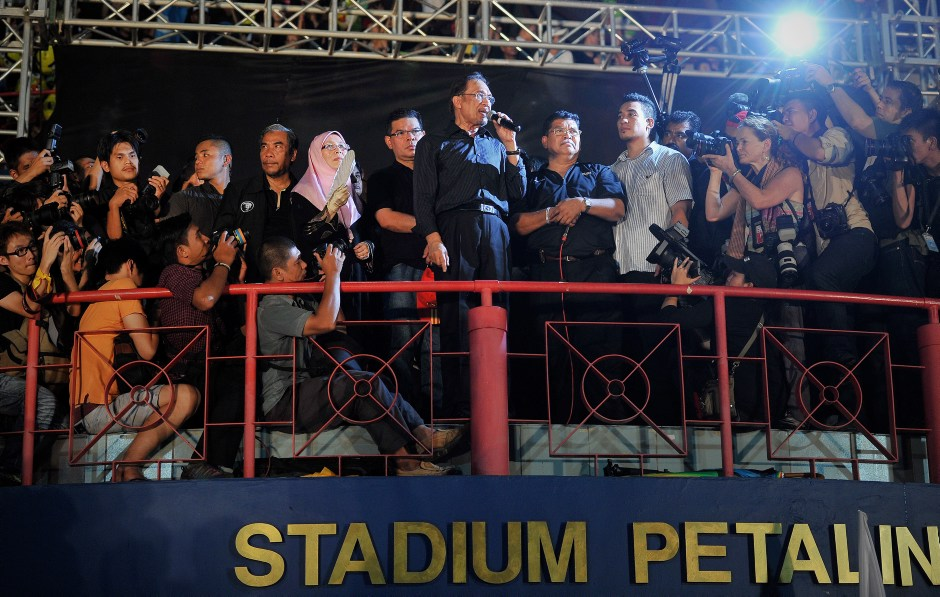
Anwar speaking at a rally denouncing the May 2013 election results

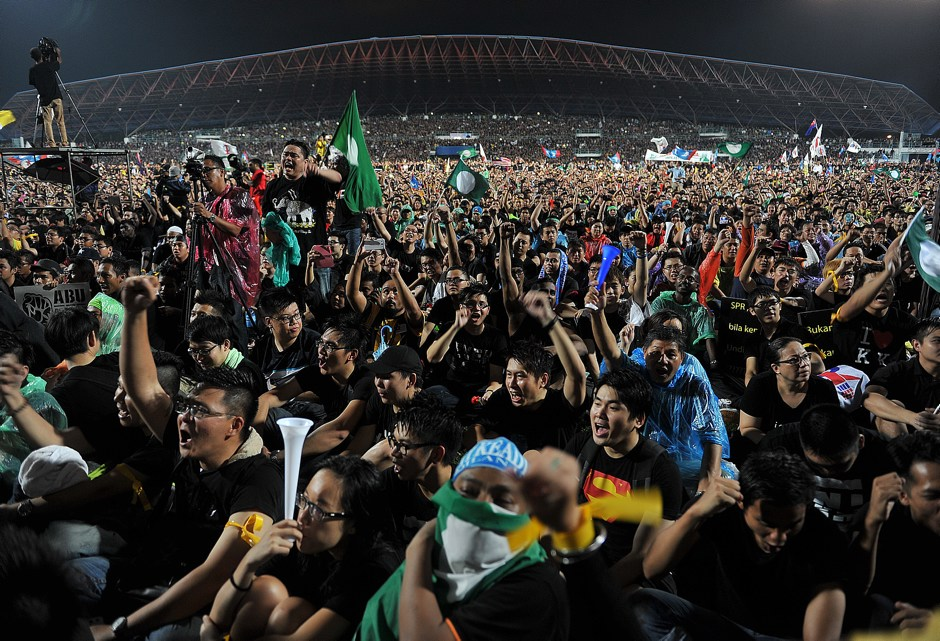
A crowd of black-clad protesters at Kelana Jaya, Selangor

Najib Razak told the media the day after the election: "We have to show to the world that we are a mature democracy. Whatever happens, the decision of the people, the will of the people must be respected." He added: "After my inauguration as prime minister, I vow to honestly carry out all my obligations with full dedication. I will be truly faithful to Malaysia and will preserve, protect and defend the institution." Anwar Ibrahim reacted in calling for two days of protests in saying the win was the "worst electoral fraud in our history" and that he "call[s] upon as many Malaysians to join hands and express our rejection and disgust at the unprecedented electoral fraud committed by Najib Razak and the EC (Election Commission)."

Herizal Hazri of the Malaysia Asia Foundation said: "There is a sense of rejection within the urban Malaysian voters to accept this rhetoric. They want a more inclusive Malaysia, they want to vote for parties that represents all race groups." The opposition parties had promised to revise Malaysia's affirmative action policy which favours Malays and other indigenous groups ("Bumiputra") over the Chinese and Indian minorities. Prime Minister Najib Razak claimed that this was the reason why ethnic Chinese voted for the opposition. The most perceivable swing from the ruling coalition to the opposition, namely from the BN-affiliated MCA and Gerakan parties to the DAP, was among ethnic Chinese voters. This led to Najib claiming that the opposition had manipulated and deceived this population group and making a "Chinese tsunami" accountable for his alliance's losses. However, the claim was disputed by political analyst Datuk Dr Shamsul Amri Baharuddin, who claimed it was more accurately, an urban swing. The geographic distribution of votes shows a considerable difference between largely urban regions with a great proportion of ethnic Chinese which mostly voted for the oppositional alliance – often by a high margin – and more rural states populated by "Bumiputra" where the governing coalition won most of its seats.

On 8 May Anwar led a rally in the Kelana Jaya football stadium near Kuala Lumpur. According to online sources that support PR, 120,000 people participated. Since the stadium usually can hold approximately 25,000 people, skeptics estimated that the number of participants ranged from 64,000 to 69,000. PR supporters claimed that the election was a sham.

Pakatan Rakyat suffered from a leadership crisis after the election, including the withdrawal of PAS from the coalition in 2015. The coalition thus automatically dissolved and was replaced by Pakatan Harapan.

== See also ==
- 2013 Malaysian state elections
