= Illegal immigration to Malaysia =

Illegal immigration to Malaysia is the cross-border movement of people to Malaysia under conditions where official authorisation is lacking, breached, expired, fraudulent, or irregular. The cross-border movement of workers has become well-established in Southeast Asia, with Malaysia a major labour-receiving country and Indonesia and the Philippines the region's main labour-sending states. Managing cross-border migration (labour, refugee and human trafficking) has become an issue of increasing concern in Malaysia and its international relations.

== Definitions ==
The term "illegal", when applied to "migration" and "migrant", has been replaced in recent years by "irregular" and "undocumented" on the grounds that "illegal" is inaccurate, degrading, and prejudicial. Key institutions have adopted the new terms: the UN General Assembly (1975), the International Labour Organization (2004), the European Parliament (2009), and the Associated Press (2013) and other US news agencies.

The new terms are rarely used in official and academic discourse in Malaysia, where the popular term is "illegal immigrant". The term "illegals", elsewhere perceived as outdated and pejorative, is regularly used in Malaysian media.

The terminology is also obscure because Malaysian law (Immigration Act 1959/63) does not distinguish between undocumented economic migrants, refugees, asylum seekers and trafficked people; all are designated as illegal immigrants. The term "illegal immigrant" designates a variety of groups who are all liable to arrest, detention and deportation for immigration offences:

- People who enter clandestinely, without travel authorisation
- Children born to immigrants whose births have not been registered
- Those seeking asylum, refugees, and trafficked victims
- Those admitted with proper authorisation but who breach the terms of admission (e.g., by entering on student or tourist visas and then working)
- Those admitted with authorisation to work, but who breach the terms of that authorisation (e.g., by changing their work or employer)
- Those admitted with authorisation to work, but whose work permit is wrongfully cancelled by employers in a labour dispute
- Those admitted with proper authorisation, but whose authorisation to stay has expired
- Those admitted with authorisation to work but whose work authorisation has expired
- Refugees in Sabah who were admitted for a temporary stay under the IMM13P (which must be renewed annually), but who fail to renew
- Those possessing counterfeit or forged authorisation
- Those possessing official authorisation which was obtained fraudulently

== Background ==
Patterns of migration and the roles and responses of governments in the region concerning migration are rooted in the region's history. Present-day Malaysia has been a migration crossroads, where borders were lacking or permeable.

=== Pre-colonial migration ===
Malaysia's first generations of migrants were indigenous peoples, the Orang Asli, believed to have been part of the first wave of migration from Africa about 50,000 years ago or more-recent Asian evolution. The Malay Peninsula developed from port towns which thrived on trade routes from China to India and hosted the next migrants as merchants settled in the ports, some assimilating into the local communities. By the fifth century AD, networks of these towns had evolved into organised political spheres of influence defined by their centre rather than their borders. At the periphery, control is less certain. Borders may be permeable and control sometimes overlaps; areas might be under several powers, or none.

During the second-century Langkasuka kingdoms, the eighth-century Srivijaya empire and the 15th-century Malacca Sultanate, the centre of power shifted between Sumatra and the Malay Peninsula. In addition to their link by political rule, Sumatra and the Malay Peninsula were also linked by intermarriage between the Sumatran and Peninsular ruling elite (which led to the migration of their followers).

Other significant early migrants are those now classified as Melayu Anak Dagang (non-Malays who migrated to the region and later assimilated into Malay culture, distinct from Melayu Anak Jati: ethnic Malays who are native to the region, including the Minangkabau people from Sumatra and the Bugis people from Sulawesi, Indonesia. Based on Malaysia's long history as a society of migrants, researchers at University Sains Malaysia say: "It is, however, pertinent to put the record straight that migration of people to the artificially created enclave known as Malaysia today dated back to centuries. Malaysia like many ex-colonies is artificial ..."

Researcher Anthony Reid draws another conclusion from this history – that Malaysia, like the US and Australia, is best viewed as an immigrant society:

In Malaysia, of course, official ideology requires that 62 percent of the population be regarded as "sons of the soil", defined in racial terms rather than place of birth. But there is also an older pre-nationalist tradition there of understanding Malaya as an immigrant society, and a tendency as in other immigrant societies for the relatively recent migrants in all communities to provide much of the innovative energy and leadership ...

=== Refugees and asylum-seekers ===
Malaysia, like most of its Southeast Asian neighbours, did not sign the 1951 UN Refugee Convention and maintains that newly-arrived aliens are illegal immigrants rather than refugees. However, since the early 1970s it has allowed Muslims involved in a conflict in their own country (especially the Moro people of the southern Philippines) to seek refuge in Malaysia. In 1975, Malaysia accepted thousands of Cambodian Muslims who had fled the Pol Pot regime. During the Indochina refugee crisis, Malaysia allowed a small number of Cambodian Muslims to immigrate (assisted by the Malaysian Muslim Welfare Organisation, funded by the United Nations High Commission for Refugees (UNHCR) and the Malaysian government. In 1980, Malaysia began admitting Rohingya and Acehnese Muslims who were fleeing the persecution in Myanmar and insurgency in Indonesia.

Malaysian Deputy Minister of Home Affairs Wan Junaidi Tuanku Jaafar said in 2015 that his ministry has told the UNHCR several times that "Malaysia is not a signatory to its convention on refugees", and the United Nations should send refugees to another Third-World nation. Junaidi also said that refugees and migrant workers needed to observe Malaysian law in the country. According to Deputy Foreign Minister Reezal Merican Naina Merican,

Although Malaysia doesn't want to become part of the convention, our country will continue to give any assistance needed by the refugees based on humanitarian grounds. Our country only recognised/allowed those (refugees) who registered with UNHCR to seek temporarily shelter in this country before they been moved to another third world countries or return to their place of origin.

== Immigration management ==
=== Domestic politics ===
According to a National Registration Department (NRD) official, 60,000 illegal immigrants in the east Malaysian state of Sabah received Malaysian identity cards (MyKads); such allegations are known as Project IC. Former senator and state assemblyman Chong Eng Leong alleged in 2012 that there are 700,000 "Project IC citizens" and that 200,000 of them are on the state electoral roll. This was done through an ethnic connection to people in certain Malaysian occupations (such as the NRD, politics or security forces). A syndicate from Pakistan has mainly Pakistani clients, and syndicates from Myanmar and Indonesia have their own clients. Filipinos with identity documents brought family members to Sabah. An officer of the Eastern Sabah Security Command said that the corruption of local authorities and the issuance of fraudulent identity cards played an important role in the increase of crime in Sabah. Former Prime Minister Mahathir Mohamad has said that illegal immigrants long resident in Malaysia should not be barred from citizenship.

According to researchers Myfel Joseph Paluga and Andrea Malaya Ragragio of the University of the Philippines Mindanao, the flood of migrants from Mindanao to Sabah was partly encouraged by Sabah politicians who "wanted to be the Sultan of Sulu" after the fall of the United Sabah National Organisation (USNO) and Sabah People's United Front (BERJAYA) administrations. Following the rampant Islamisation and Muslims migration led by USNO chief Mustapha Harun, the Muslim population in Sabah drastically increased with negative perception from the native indigenous towards the Islamic religion also increased as it have been endangering the local culture and practice of the indigenous. As part of the Islamisation of Sabah state, Malaysia affords shelter around Sabah to Filipino Muslims escaping from the conflicts between Philippine government and their fellow separatists in their homeland of Mindanao. The Eastern Sabah Security Command Security Coordinating Intelligence Officer said that although the foreigners remained in Sabah, their loyalty to their homeland (Mindanao and Sulu Archipelago) in the Philippines never swayed and they brought drugs, smuggling and piracy. The Filipinos from this region are reportedly vengeful and ill-tempered and disputes often result in shooting and bloody feuds ("a culture they call Rido").

During the influx of the Vietnamese boat people, the Malaysian government felt that they would threaten its national security and racial balance; most refugees resemble Malaysian Chinese, resulting in quick repatriation. The Malaysian government blamed the United States, accusing it of causing the Vietnam War and a massive influx of refugees to Vietnam's neighbours. Some Sabah Muslim MPs and State Assembly members, such as Rosnah Shirlin and Abdul Rahim Ismail, were aware of the Filipino Muslim problem. According to Shirlin,

The refugee camp established in my district has been creating a lot of problems for the residents here. The camp has become a drugs den and the source of many other criminal activities. Over the years, many robberies had taken place in nearby villages and the culprits are mostly from the camp. Supposedly, the improved situation in the Philippines today has brought into question whether these Filipinos could still be regarded as refugees. The camp was set up on a 40-acre plot of land near Kampung Laut in the early 1980s by the United Nations High Commission for Refugees (UNHCR). But the UNHCR had long ago stopped providing funds to the camp and as a result, many of these foreigners had been working outside the camp. The refugees had even dared to expand the camp area, encroaching on nearby village land and today, the camp has become the biggest syabu distribution den in my district.

Rahim agreed:

For decades, my village and several villages in my constituency — was a beautifully rustic villages of traditional fishermen, who went about their daily lives with no cause for worry except for the latest catch of the day. Sabah's long-standing issues with illegal immigration are starting to irk local communities, who live fearing for their safety and culture. The ambience of the village has changed. The most obvious change now is the security fears in the village where I was born and grew up in. There is a colony of some 50 or so illegal immigrants who are living on a private piece of land that was supposedly rented out to them. The illegal immigrants roam around the village, and the town area, the pump boats they use are becoming a common sight here. I've brought it up to the authorities before; the police, immigration and district office. I appreciate some steps being taken, but it is not enough to give confidence to the local residents. If left unattended, Sabah will be susceptible to a lot of social ills — illegal drug dealing and consumption, theft and robbery and a "pump boat culture". The authorities also need to ensure that Sabahan land owners do not rent out their land randomly to anybody and contravening the Sabah Land Ordinance.

— Abdul Rahim Ismail, Sabah State Legislative Assembly Members for Pantai Manis in Papar

The Royal Commission of Inquiry on illegal immigrants in Sabah investigated the granting of citizenship to illegal immigrants. Former National Registration Director Mohd Nasir Sugip said that he was part of a secret operation, Ops Durian Buruk (Operation Rotten Durian), during the early 1990s in which the Election Commission of Malaysia and former Deputy Home Minister Megat Junid Megat Ayub instructed his department to issue national identity cards to foreigners to change Sabah's voting demographics. The names of 16,000 illegal immigrants were changed by the instruction of the Sabah Election Commission. Former Sabah NRD director Ramli Kamarudin said that former Sabah Chief Minister Osu Sukam was present when Megat Junid gave instructions to carry out the project IC exercise.

A Filipino man said that he received an identity card without applying for it, and Indian and Pakistani immigrants said that they received identity cards less than 10 years after they arrived in Sabah during the 1980s. The irregularities reportedly angered Sabahan natives, including those in neighbouring Sarawak. The Christian Dayak people are stateless, without birth certificates, while the newly-arrived illegal immigrants can obtain Malaysian identity cards in a short time. The Malaysian government reportedly favours Muslim asylum-seekers.

=== National security ===
In 2008, the Sabah deputy chief minister said that some illegal immigrants attempted to become Malaysian security-force members with fake identity cards. A Sulu militant in Sabah was a Malaysian police corporal with family in the southern Philippines who was believed to have aided militants in illegally entering and leaving the state. A security guard from Tawau in Sabah killed a bank officer in Subang Jaya, Selangor during a robbery. The security guard had a fake identity card, and was later identified as an Indonesian from Sulawesi. Member of parliament Lim Kit Siang asked how the security guard obtained a MyKad, enabling him to work at the bank:

How can this person get a MyKad, and even if the MyKad is fake, how can he be allowed to open up a bank account, receive monthly salary and in fact be given a firearm licence by the Home Ministry? Did this person also vote in the 13th General Election? Is it because the owner of the security firm is a crony of the ruling party? How many foreigners have enjoyed these privileges?

— Lim Kit Siang of the (then) opposition Democratic Action Party

In addition to Sabah, the border in the Straits of Malacca between Peninsular Malaysia and Sumatra enabled Indonesian immigrants to illegally enter the country; in 2014, an overloaded migrant boat sank.

=== Human trafficking ===
Malaysia, Thailand and Venezuela were listed in the third and lowest tier of the US Department of State's 2014 Trafficking in Persons Report. The country has made little progress to combat the exploitation of foreign migrant workers subjected to forced labour and those recruited under false pretenses and coerced into sex work. Rohingya refugees, seeking a better life in Malaysia, are frequently victimised by human traffickers who confine, beat and starve them and demand ransoms from their families. Many Filipinas, promised good jobs in other countries by brokers in the Philippines, have been trafficked to Malaysia and are vulnerable to detention by Malaysian authorities for illegal entry. Vietnamese and Chinese traffickers have shifted their prostitution rings to Malaysia, making Vietnamese women the largest number of foreign prostitutes in the country (followed by Cambodian women). Traffickers usually offer victims good-paying jobs in Malaysia; when they meet a trafficker (posing as a manager), they are imprisoned, raped and forced into sex work. Chinese traffickers kidnapped children, maimed them and used them to beg in the streets of Kuala Lumpur.

Malaysia is an electrical-parts manufacturing centre, and large companies such as Panasonic and Samsung (as well as the McDonald's fast-food chain) were accused of poor treatment of workers. Cambodian housemaids have reportedly been poorly treated, and a Cambodian maid detained in a Malaysian immigration centre said that she saw three Cambodian and Vietnamese women die after severe abuse; Thai, Indonesian and Laotian prisoners were also reportedly abused. This however refuted by Malaysian Deputy Home Minister Nur Jazlan Mohamed who said the matter has been investigated and no deaths are actually occurred. Nevertheless, a Malaysian couple were sentenced to death for starving their Cambodian maid to death.

Child-selling is ongoing, with babies brought from countries such as Thailand and Cambodia. Some are bought by infertile couples, but the less fortunate are sold to traffickers and forced to become sex slaves or beggars. Prostitution rings also offer babies from their foreign sex workers who become pregnant; some sex workers contact couples to offer their babies, since Malaysian law forbids migrant workers from having children in the country.

=== Social impact ===
In 1986, the United Nations High Commissioner for Refugees (UNHCR) attempted to integrate Filipino refugees in Sabah with local communities if it could not repatriate them to the Philippines; however, this was opposed by the Sabah state government and local residents. The UNHCR tried a similar solution in 2015, issuing refugee cards in West Malaysia without government approval.

== Policy ==
The Immigration Department of Malaysia has promised that Malaysia will be free from illegal immigrants in 2020.

=== Amnesty programme ===
In 2011, Malaysia introduced Program 6P to reduce the number of illegal immigrants. The 6P is shorthand for six Malay words beginning with p: pendaftaran (registration), pemutihan (legalisation), pengampunan (amnesty), pemantauan (supervision), penguatkuasaan (enforcement) and pengusiran (deportation). Illegal immigrants were given three weeks to accept the offer or face legal penalties if found without a valid travel document or work permit. There was a call to strengthen the programme by monitoring management companies appointed as intermediaries between employers and illegal foreign workers.

=== Enforcement ===
Malaysian authorities have frequently cracked down on illegal immigrants (sometimes without notice), with more frequent enforcement since 2014. Illegal immigrants are imprisoned, caned and deported. In early 2017, a former employee of the Malaysian Registration Department (JPN) was sentenced to 156 years in prison for giving illegal citizenship to Filipino immigrants in Sabah.

=== Regional co-operation ===
A joint border commission has been formed with the Philippines to patrol from the southern Philippines to East Malaysia, and Thailand has agreed to lengthen its border wall along the Malaysian state of Kedah to curb the flow of illegal workers across the Malay–Thai border. Spanish Ambassador to Malaysia María Bassols Delgado has urged the country to develop closer ties with other ASEAN nations to solve the immigrant problem: "Close understanding between Asean countries would result in a more effective approach to identify the individuals who entered the country illegally and without identification papers. This would facilitate the process of sending them back to their countries of origin". Malaysia received two Bay-class patrol boats from Australia in 2015, and said that the vessels would be used to protect their maritime borders from illegal migration across the Straits of Malacca. Before a November 2016 meeting between Philippine President Rodrigo Duterte and Malaysian Prime Minister Najib Razak in Putrajaya, both leaders agreed to deport illegal Filipino migrants and refugees in Sabah back to the Philippines and signed agreements to improve the social conditions of legal Filipino migrants and expatriates in the state with a school, hospital, and consulate. That month, Thai Defence Minister Prawit Wongsuwan announced a plan to replace the southern Malay–Thai border fence with a wall; Wongsuwan got the idea from a meeting in Laos with his Malaysian counterparts.

== See also ==
- Pendatang asing, a term used by Malaysians for immigrants or foreigners
