= Abdul Mutalib Mohamed Daud =

Political detainee and news portal founder

- Born: Abdul Mutalib; 1961
- Died: 29 June 2013 (aged 51–52); Kuala Lumpur
- Other name: Mutalib MD

Abdul Mutalib Mohd Daud (also known as Mutalib MD; 1961 – 29 June 2013) was an ISA detainee, as well as the founder and chief editor of the news portal Sabahkini.net in Sabah, Malaysia. At the time of his death, he had completed two as yet unpublished books, one on the banning of Nurul Izzah Anwar from Sabah. In 2011 Communications and Culture Minister Datuk Seri Dr. Rais Yatim filed a defamation lawsuit against Mutalib for allegations that the minister had raped his maid. He is the author of over 20 books, two of which, YB and VIP, are about sex scandals among public personalities.

== Selected publications ==
- IC Palsu: Merampas Hak Anak Sabah.
- IC Projek Agenda Tersembunyi Mahathir (where Mahathir stood for Mahathir Mohamad, the former prime minister of Malaysia).
- Skandal Seks VVIP.

== See also ==
- Royal Commission of Inquiry on illegal immigrants in Sabah
- Project IC
- Megat Junid Megat Ayub
