= Kuching Declaration =

2012 declaration by major Malaysian political parties

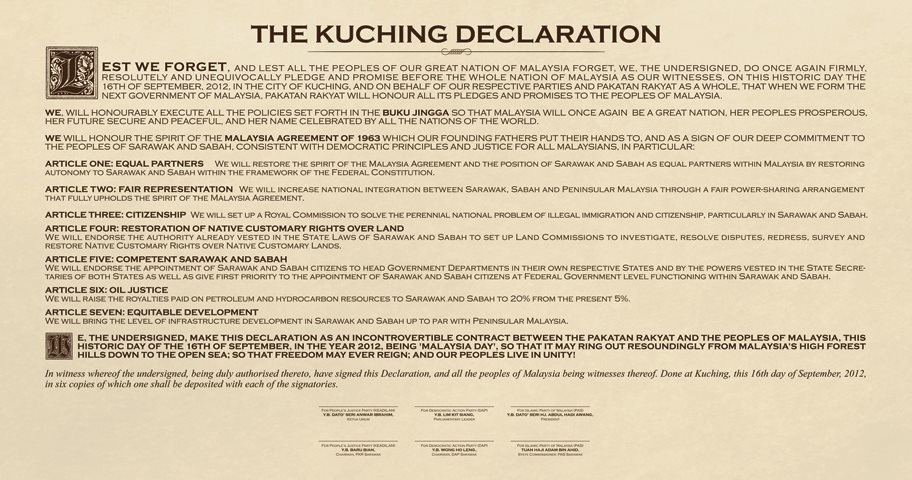
- Created: 16 September 2012
- Location: Deposited by each of the signatories
- Signatories: Anwar Ibrahim, Baru Bian (PKR); Lim Kit Siang, Wong Ho Leng (DAP); Abdul Hadi Awang, Adam Ahid (PAS)
- Purpose: To announce and explain the pledge and promise of honour the spirit of the Malaysia Agreement of 1963 to the nations and peoples of the states of Sarawak and Sabah.^{[a]} Note: a. Formerly North Borneo (now Sabah)

The Kuching Declaration (Iban: Jaku penetap Kuching; Malay: Perisytiharan Kuching) was adopted on 16 September 2012 by the three component parties of the Pakatan Rakyat coalition. The declaration was signed by Anwar Ibrahim and Baru Bian representing the People's Justice Party (PKR), Lim Kit Siang and Wong Ho Leng representing the Democratic Action Party (DAP), and Abdul Hadi Awang and Adam Ahid representing the Pan-Malaysian Islamic Party (PAS). The signing ceremony took place at Chonglin Park, Kuching, Sarawak, in conjunction with Malaysia Day celebrations.

The declaration, written in English, pledged to uphold the spirit of the Malaysia Agreement of 1963 for the nations and peoples of Sarawak and Sabah if the coalition were to form the next federal government of Malaysia.

== The Declaration ==
The Kuching Declaration was formally signed on 16 September 2012 in Kuching, Sarawak. The text of the declaration was issued in English, Iban, and Malay. It outlined Pakatan Rakyat's pledges to uphold the Malaysia Agreement of 1963 and addressed the political status and rights of Sarawak and Sabah within the federation.

=== English ===
Lest we forget, and lest all the peoples of our great Nation of Malaysia forget, we the undersigned do once again firmly, resolutely and unequivocally pledge and promise before the whole Nation of Malaysia as our witness, on this historically day 16 September 2012, in the City of Kuching, and on behalf of our respective parties and Pakatan Rakyat will honour all its pledges and promises to the peoples of Malaysia.

We will honourably execute all the policies set forth in the Buku Jingga so that Malaysia will once again be a great Nation, her peoples prosperous, her future secure and peaceful, and her name celebrated by all the nations of the world.

We will honour the spirit of the Malaysia Agreement of 1963 which our founding fathers put their hands to, and as a sign of our deep commitment to the peoples of Sarawak and Sabah, consistent with democratic principles and justice for all Malaysians, in particular:

ARTICLE ONE: EQUAL PARTNERS
We will restore the spirit of the Malaysia Agreement and the position of Sarawak and Sabah as equal partners within Malaysia by restoring autonomy to Sarawak and Sabah within the framework of the Federal Constitution.

ARTICLE TWO: FAIR REPRESENTATION
We will increase national integration between Sarawak, Sabah and Peninsular Malaysia through a fair power-sharing arrangement that fully upholds the spirit of the Malaysia Agreement.

ARTICLE THREE: CITIZENSHIP
We will set up a Royal Commission to solve the perennial national problem of illegal immigration and citizenship, particularly in Sarawak and Sabah.

ARTICLE FOUR: RESTORATION OF NATIVE CUSTOMARY RIGHTS OVER LAND
We will endorse the authority already vested in the State Laws of Sarawak and Sabah to set up Land Commissions to investigate, resolve disputes, redress, survey and restore Native Customary Rights over Native Customary Lands.

ARTICLE FIVE: COMPETENT SARAWAK AND SABAH
We will endorse the appointment of Sarawak and Sabah citizens to head Government Departments in their own respective States and by the powers vested in the State Secretaries of both States as well as give first priority to the appointment of Sarawak and Sabah citizens at Federal Government level functioning within Sarawak and Sabah.

ARTICLE SIX: OIL JUSTICE
We will raise the royalties paid on petroleum and hydrocarbon resources to Sarawak and Sabah to 20% from the present 5%.

ARTICLE SEVEN: EQUITABLE DEVELOPMENT
We will bring the level of infrastructure development in Sarawak and Sabah up to par with Peninsular Malaysia.

We, the undersigned, make this declaration as an incontrovertible contract between the Pakatan Rakyat and the peoples of Malaysia, this historic day of 16 September 2012 on Malaysia Day, so that it may ring out resoundingly from Malaysia's high forest hills down to the open sea; so that freedom may ever reign; and our peoples live in unity!

In witness whereof the undersigned, being duly authorised thereto, have signed this Declaration, and all the peoples of Malaysia being witnesses thereof.

Done at Kuching, this 16th day of September, 2012, in six copies of which one shall be deposited with each of the signatories.

=== Iban ===
Sebedau kami nyau enda ingat agi, lalu sebedau bala orang di menua Malaysia tu enda ingat agi, kami, ti ngelabuhka sainjari ditu, sekali agi bersemaya ba mua menua Malaysia tu jadika saksi kami, kena sehari tu 16hb Sembilan, 2012, di negeri Kuching, lalu mega ngarika semua parti politik enggau Pakatan Rakyat, iya nya, lebuh kami numbuhka perintah baru di menua Malaysia, Pakatan Rakyat deka bebasa sereta ngamatika semua danji enggau semaya iya ngagai peranak menua Malaysia.

Kami deka enggau basa ti tinggi berjalaika semua polisi ti udah ditetepka kami dalam Bup Jingga ngambika menua Malaysia ulih nyadi sebengkah menua ti tampak, bala peranak menua iya tau bertambah kaya, dudi hari iya tau likun sereta selamat, lalu nama iya deka dikemesaika sereta dipelandikka menua bukai di dunya tu.

Kami deka bebasaka semengat dalam Sempekat Malaysia tahun 1963 ti ditanggam bala tuai-tuai menua kami, ti laluadika kelai penaluk kami ke orang Sarawak enggau Sabah, enda begilik penemu dalam atur demokrasi lalu enda bebelah bagi ba semua peranak Malaysia, kelebih agi:

:PEKARA KESATU: SEKUNSI :Kami deka mulaika semengat dalam Sempekat Malaysia lalu berakupka penuduk Sarawak enggau Sabah dalam Serakup Malaysia enggau chara meri pulai kuasa merintah diri (autonomi) ke Sarawak enggau Sabah belalauka Tampuk Adat Perintah Besai.

:PEKARA KEDUA: BEPENGARI SAMA RATA :Kami deka ngemanahka agi kaul entara Sarawak, Sabah enggau Semenanjung Malaysia nengah atur bekunsi kuasa ti nyeridi semengat Sempekat Malaysia.

:PEKARA KETIGA: PERANAK MENUA :Kami deka numbuhka Komisyen Di-Raja dikena mutarka penanggul peranak menua luar ke enda sah nyadi peranak menua Malaysia, pia mega penanggul tu ke udah nuntung Sarawak enggau Sabah.

:PEKARA KEEMPAT: MERI PULAI TANAH BANSA ASAL (NCR) :Kami deka ngamatka sereta ngemendarka kuasa ti udah ditetapka dalam Adat Menua Sarawak enggau Sabah dikena numbuhka Komisyen Tanah dikena mansik, mutarka penyarut, nyikapka atur nyukat lalu meri pulai hak Tanah Bansa Asal ba Tanah Bansa Asal.

:PEKARA KELIMA: PENGELANDIK GAWA PERANAK MENUA SARAWAK ENGGAU SABAH :Kami deka ngamat sereta ngemendarka padu mangku pengawa ke semua peranak menua Sarawak enggau Sabah nyadi kepala dalam Opis-Opis Perintah di menua sida empu lalu ngena kuasa-kuasa Sekretari-Sekretari Menua ke dua buah menua nya lalu pia mega ngenuluka padu mangku pengawa ke peranak menua Sarawak enggau Sabah ba ikas Perintah Besai ti bekereja di menua Sarawak enggau Sabah.

:PEKARA KEENAM: ASIL MINYAK TI PATUT ::Kami deka nikika bayar minyak petroleum enggau asil hidrokarbon ke menua Sarawak enggau Sabah ngagai ikas 20% ari penyampau 5% ke ngelama tu.

:PEKARA KETUJUH: PEMANSANG SAMA RATA :Kami deka nikika ikas pemansang infrastrukta di menua Sarawak enggau Sabah sama bela sebaka enggau ikas di Semenanjung Malaysia.

kami, jadika ti ngengkahka sainjari, ngaga penetap ti jadika semaya entara Pakatan Rakyat enggau semua peranak Malaysia, kena seharitu 16hb September 2012, beserimbai enggau Hari Malaysia, ngambika auh iya didinga ari tuchung munggu lalu nelusur ngili batang sungai nyentuk ke tasik besai; awakka kitai dilepaska; lalu peranak raban bansa kitai ulih idup dalam penyerakup !

Disaksika ngelabuhka sainjari, ti diberi kuasa, lalu semua peranak Malaysia jadika saksi ditu.

Disain di nengeri Kuching, kena seharitu 16hb Sembilan, 2012, dalam enam salin ti endur genap salin deka disimpan genap iku orang ti ngelabuhka sainjari.

=== In Malay ===
Jangan sampai kita lupa, dan jangan sampai masyarakat Malaysia yang terbilang ini betah terlupa bahawasanya kami, yang bertandatangan di bawah, sekali lagi dengan penuh tekad dan iltizam sepenuh jiwa dan raga berikrar dan berjanji bersaksikan seluruh warganegara Malaysia, pada hari ini yakni pada tarikh bersejarah 16 September 2012, di bandaraya Kuching, bagi pihak parti-parti yang berkenaan dan Pakatan Rakyat seluruhnya bila mana kami mengijtirafkan kerajaan baru buat Malaysia, Pakatan Rakyat akan melunasi setiap ikrar dan janji kami pada setiap lapisan masyarakat dan rakyat Malaysia.

Bahawasanya kami akan memelihara dan menjunjung setia dasar-dasar yang diterapkan didalam Buku Jingga supaya Malaysia bakal bangkit semula sebagai negara yang makmur, agar terwujud rakyat yang cemerlang, bersatu padu dan berkembang maju, dengan masa depan yang selamat dan aman damai, agar namanya harum di serata pelusuk dunia.

Bahawa sesungguhnya kami berpegang teguh dengan semangat Perjanjian Malaysia 1963 yang telah dicetuskan dan dikendalikan oleh pemimpin-pemimpin kami yang terdahulu, dan sebagai bukti dan tanda utuhnya kesetiaan kami terhadap rakyat Serawak dan Sabah, berteraskan prinsip-prinsip demokrasi dan keadilan untuk rakyat Malaysia seluruhnya, dengan pengkhususan istimewa terhadap perkara-perkara berikut:

:PERKARA 1: KERJASAMA BERSEKUTU :Kami akan memulihara intipati Perjanjian Malaysia dan memperkasakan kedudukan Sarawak dan Sabah setanding dengan Semenanjung Malaysia dengan mengembalikan autonomi Sarawak dan Sabah mengikut lunas Perlembagaan Persekutuan.

:PERKARA 2: PERWAKILAN YANG ADIL :Kami akan mempertingkatkan integrasi nasional di antara Sarawak, Sabah dan Semenanjung Malaysia melalui penggemblengan tenaga dan perkongsian kuasa secara adil yang menjunjung semangat Perjanjian Malaysia.

:PERKARA 3: KEWARGANEGARAAN :Kami akan menubuhkan Suruhanjaya DiRaja bagi menyelesaikan masalah nasional berkaitan pendatang tanpa izin dan isu-isu kerakyatan, khususnya di Sarawak dan Sabah.

:PERKARA 4: PENGIKTIRAFAN HAK KE ATAS TANAH ADAT :Kami akan menghormati dan mengiktiraf hak anak watan ke atas tanah adat sepertimana yang tertakluk dan termaktub dalam Undang-undang Negeri Sarawak dan Sabah dengan menubuhkan Suruhanjaya Tanah untuk menyiasat, menyelesaikan pertikaian, memperbaharui, menyelidik dan memulihkan Hak Adat Peribumi ke atas pemilikan Tanah Adat.

:PERKARA 5: KECEKAPAN DAN KEMANDIRIAN SARAWAK DAN SABAH :Kami akan mengiktiraf perlantikan rakyat Sarawak dan Sabah untuk memimpin dan memegang jawatan di Jabatan Kerajaan di negeri masing-masing, dikuatkuasakan oleh Setiausaha-setiausaha kerajaan kedua-dua negeri dan memberikan keutamaan kepada rakyat Sarawak dan Sabah di peringkat Kerajaan Persekutuan untuk menjalankan tugas di negeri masing-masing.

:PERKARA 6: KEADILAN DALAM ISU MINYAK :Kami akan menaikkan bayaran royalti ke atas petroleum dan sumber sumber hidrokarbon kepada Sarawak dan Sabah dari 5% ke 20%.

:PERKARA 7: PEMBANGUNAN SEKATA :Kami akan membawa tahap kemajuan infrastruktur di Sarawak dan Sabah setanding dengan perkembangan di Semenanjung Malaysia.

Dengan ini, kami yang bertanda tangan seperti tertera di bawah, mengiktiraf perisytiharan ini sebagai satu perjanjian yang tidak boleh disangkal dan dipersoalkan lagi, termaktub di antara Pakatan Rakyat dan segenap lapisan masyarakat Malaysia, pada hari ini, tanggal 16 September 2012, bersempena dengan sambutan Hari Malaysia, agar tersohorlah gegak gempitanya dari puncak tertinggi di bumi Malaysia tercinta, dan akan tersebar seluas samudera yang terbentang supaya kebebasan dapat kita capai dan kita semua boleh hidup bersatu padu dalam suasana aman dan damai.

Sebagai saksi padanya, penandatangan yang diberi kuasa dalam hal ini, telah menandatangani Perisytiharan ini, dan semua rakyat Malaysia adalah saksi kepadanya.

Dimeterai di Kuching, pada 16 haribulan September tahun 2012, dalam enam salinan di mana setiap satu darinya akan disimpan oleh setiap penandatangan.

== See also ==
- Malaysia Agreement
- Malaysia Act 1963
- Manila Accord
- 20-point agreement
- United Nations General Assembly Resolution 1514 (XV)
- United Nations General Assembly Resolution 1541 (XV)
