= 2013 Malaysian general election protest =

Political protests in Malaysia

Himpunan Black Out 2013
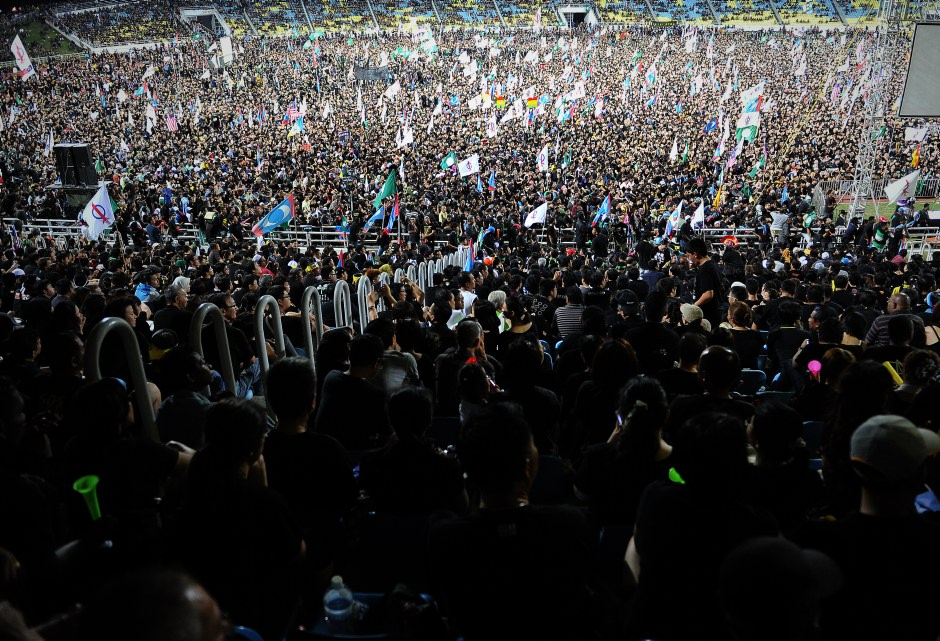
- A crowd of black-clad protesters at Penang State Stadium, Penang.
- Date: 8 May – 22 June 2013
- Location: Every state in Malaysia and federal territory of Kuala Lumpur except Sabah and Sarawak.
- Caused by: Allegations of fraud in 2013 Malaysian general election
- Goals: To express discontent with the election result
- Status: Concluded

Parties
Pakatan Rakyat	None

Lead figures
Anwar Ibrahim	None

Number
120,000 (First Rally); 150,000 (Second Rally)	None

Casualties and losses
0	0

The 2013 Malaysian general election protest or Himpunan Black Out 2013 (Malay) was a series of rallies held throughout Malaysia after the 2013 general election to express discontent with the election result. The first rally was in Kelana Jaya, Malaysia on 8 May 2013. The rally was held by various Malaysian opposition-friendly non-governmental organisations and opposition parties claiming that there had been irregularities in the polling. The main venue chosen for the rally was Kelana Jaya Stadium. Web sites and blogs favourable to the opposition claimed that the rally was attended by 120,000 people. Noting that the stadium's normal capacity is about 25,000, other sources estimated the number of people in and around it to be between 64,000 and 69,000.

== List of nationwide "Himpunan Black Out" rallies ==
- 1st Rally – Kelana Jaya, 8 May 2013
- 2nd Rally – Batu Kawan, 11 May 2013
- 3rd Rally – Ipoh, 12 May 2013
- 4th Rally – Kuantan, 14 May 2013
- 5th Rally – Johor Bahru, 15 May 2013
- 6th Rally – Seremban, 17 May 2013
- 7th Rally – Alor Setar, 21 May 2013
- 8th Rally – Kuala Terengganu, 23 May 2013
- 9th Rally – Bukit Katil, 24 May 2013
- 10th Rally – Himpunan Kemuncak Blackout 505 (Petaling Jaya, 25 May 2013)
- 11th Rally – Kangar, 10 June 2013
- 12th Rally – Sungai Petani, 11 June 2013
- 13th Rally – Kota Bharu, 11 June 2013
- 14th Rally – Batu Pahat, 16 June 2013
- 15th Rally – Kuala Lumpur (Taman Merbok), 22 June 2013

== Accusing the Election Commission of fraudulent conduct ==
The rally was initiated by Anwar Ibrahim, who claimed that the election was fraudulent. The opposition won 3 states (Selangor, Kelantan and Penang), but Barisan Nasional won the elections despite losing the popular vote, thereby gaining the mandate to lead Malaysia for another 5 years. In the rally Anwar Ibrahim urged opposition supporters to wear black as a sign of protest.

== Issues raised ==
Anwar Ibrahim and other Democratic Action Party (DAP) leaders present at the rally raised issues such as phantom voters, blackouts and the usage of indelible ink by the Malaysian Election Commission.

== See also ==
- List of protests in the 21st century
