= 6P programme =

The 6P programme was a 2011 initiative of the Ministry of Home Affairs of Malaysia to legalize as many as 2 million illegal immigrants working in the country. The programme is named after six Malay words: pendaftaran (registration), pemutihan (legalisation), pengampunan (amnesty), pemantauan (supervision), penguatkuasaan (enforcement), and pengusiran (deportation). A cabinet meeting was held on 22 June to consider the Home Ministry's proposal, which was planned to take effect on 1 July. Immigrants would have three weeks to enter the amnesty programme, a period during which the intake of foreign workers would be temporarily halted. Malaysia relies heavily on foreign workers, which made up 2 million of its workforce of 12 million. Illegal foreign workers in the country numbered an additional 2 million.

Since the programme's announcement on 6 June, immigration brokers such as those in Burma saw an increased demand for their services. In response to reports of agencies collecting money from immigrants for the legalisation process, the Malaysian government began blacklisting companies because it had not authorized the collection of payment.
