= Pakatan Rakyat =

- English name: People's Alliance
- Abbreviation: PR
- Leader: Anwar Ibrahim
- Founded: 1 April 2008
- Dissolved: 16 June 2015
- Preceded by: Barisan Alternatif
- Succeeded by: Pakatan Harapan and Gagasan Sejahtera
- Headquarters: Petaling Jaya, Malaysia (PKR); Kuala Lumpur, Malaysia (DAP & PAS); Kuching, Malaysia (SNAP)
- Newspaper: Suara Keadilan; The Rocket; Harakah
- Membership: People's Justice Party (PKR); Democratic Action Party (DAP); Pan-Malaysian Islamic Party (PAS); Sarawak National Party (SNAP) April 2010 – May 2011
- Ideology: Reformism
- Political position: Big-tent
- Colours: Orange and white
- Slogan: Berpadu, Berubah, Berkat

Election symbol

Website
- pakatanrakyat.my

Pakatan Rakyat (PR; English: People's Alliance) was an informal Malaysian political coalition and successor to Barisan Alternatif (BA). The political coalition was formed by the People's Justice Party (PKR), Democratic Action Party (DAP), and Pan-Malaysian Islamic Party (PAS) on 1 April 2008, after the 12th Malaysian general election, having previously formed the Barisan Alternatif (Alternative Front) in the 10th general election. On 20 April 2010, the Sarawak National Party (SNAP) officially joined as a member of the Pakatan Rakyat after being expelled from Barisan Nasional, but quit the coalition on 6 May 2011. The DAP declared the coalition "dead" on 16 June 2015, citing the inability of the rest of the alliance to work with PAS, after PAS's congress passed the motion to sever ties with DAP without debate. It was succeeded by Pakatan Harapan and Gagasan Sejahtera.

== History ==
The Pakatan Rakyat was touted to be a maturing development of the concept of Barisan Alternatif (Alternative Front, BA) that was created during the election campaign of the 10th Malaysian General Election in 1999. Barisan Alternative was the banner and policy position document which a group of Malaysian opposition political parties (DAP, KeADILan, PAS and PRM) endorsed and coalesced around for that election.

=== 2008 general election ===
In the 2008 general election (12th Malaysian General Election), PKR, DAP, and PAS had won 41, 73, and 86 seats, respectively, in various state assemblies.

=== Registration attempts ===
Pakatan Rakyat was never registered with the Malaysian Registrar of Societies (ROS). They claimed that Malaysian law only allows the registration of a coalition comprising seven parties or more.

In October 2009, the ROS stated that Pakatan Rakyat could formally register as a coalition, as "the condition does not apply to political parties that enjoys a national status. Only [a] state-level organisation aspiring to become a national entity needs to have seven members from the states". On 9 October 2009, Lim Kit Siang announced that Pakatan would seek to register itself as a formal coalition in light of this clarification. On 4 November 2009, Pakatan Rakyat officials told the press that they had submitted a formal application to the ROS, naming Zaid Ibrahim as the chairman of the alliance. PKR MP and Information Chief Tian Chua publicly denied this, saying the coalition had not yet decided on a constitution, logo, or leadership structure. In February 2010, Pakatan Rakyat claimed it had made a fresh application to ROS as "Pakatan Rakyat Malaysia" because the name "Pakatan Rakyat" is still being registered and processed under Zaid Ibrahim's name as the pro-tem chairman.

By law, the ROS cannot consider any other application that has the same phrase in it, and has asked Pakatan Rakyat to file a fresh application. In November 2011, Pakatan Rakyat appointed PAS central committee member Kamarudin Jaffar to make a fresh application, but RoS director-general Abdul Rahman Othman claimed Kamaruddin had never approached his department. Abdul Rahman said that the ROS has no problem in approving Pakatan's registration and that he could not refuse a request made by any MP.

Zaid had requested PAS's Spiritual Leader Dato' Nik Abdul Aziz Nik Mat to become the chairman of Pakatan Rakyat instead of Anwar Ibrahim (PKR) or Hadi Awang (PAS). In November 2010, after a six-month leave from PKR over undisclosed reasons, Zaid Ibrahim quit the party, causing Pakatan Rakyat to remain as an informal coalition.

=== 2013 general election ===
In the 2013 general election (13th Malaysian General Election), the still unregistered Pakatan Rakyat won a popular majority nationwide, but due to large variations in the number of electors in different parliamentary seats, lost to the Barisan Nasional, which won 133 of the 222 federal seats and 275 of the 505 state seats.

=== Controversies ===
==== Prevention of Terrorism Act (POTA) 2015 ====
Prevention of Terrorism Act 2015 (POTA) is a law to prevent the spreading of terrorist ideologies to Malaysia. However, it has been criticised by groups such as the Malaysian Bar as a repressive legislation, likened to the repealed Internal Security Act (ISA). DAP parliamentary leader Lim Kit Siang have been noted to have told off Home Minister Datuk Seri Dr Ahmad Zahid Hamidi for failing to consult Pakatan Rakyat (PR) and civil society regarding POTA.

On 7 April 2015, after 12 hours of debating, POTA were passed by the Parliament without any amendment. The law were passed with 79 votes in favour and 60 against at 2.25 am. However, the absence of 26 Pakatan Rakyat lawmakers were heavily condemned by PR supporters, civil society activists and demonstrators. Many PR supporters who felt let down by their MPs vented their anger through the social media and news portals questioning their commitment in standing walking the talk against what they claimed to be an oppressive law. Leading the critics were a victim of 2014 Malaysian sedition dragnet, Dr. Azmi Sharom. He, sarcastically "thanked" those who absent for making POTA bill a reality. P Ramakrishnan, an Aliran executive committee member comment that them have acted irresponsibly and have betrayed the expectations of Malaysians. Mohamed Fudzail for The Malaysian Insider demand them to stop making dramas and this only prove the perceptions that lawmakers from either side will always take their position for granted. Ishmael Lim for Free Malaysia Today wrote that those lawmakers have failed to be an example for Malaysian will of change. Fa Abdul urged the PR leaders to publish those who absent. Amiran Ruslan, a journalist for The Rakyat Post called those who absent as ignorant. Khairie Hisyam Aliman, a columnist for The Malay Mail Online said that them were elected to be in the Parliament but not the other way around. Amirul Ruslan, a journalist criticise even though with vigorous and repeated criticism of the bill, it was Pakatan lawmakers who failed to muster the numbers. Solidariti Anak Muda Malaysia, a pro-Opposition NGO, slammed PR lawmakers who play truant while passing important bills. The absence of a third of PR lawmakers was also being noted when the Kampung Baru Development Bill and Prevention of Crime Act were proved in the last term.

Director of Merdeka Centre Ibrahim Suffian say that could disenchant Pakatan backers and "shameful". Among those who were absent include PKR parliamentary whip, Datuk Johari Abdul, PAS parliamentary whip, Datuk Seri Mahfuz Omar and PKR's Secretary General, Rafizi Ramli. DAP parliamentary whip Anthony Loke demand clarifies that only two of their members were absent, which include DAP secretary general, Lim Guan Eng. Other than two DAP lawmakers, each PAS and PKR had eleven lawmakers absent. They however, claimed that they had their own valid reasons for skipping POTA's bill, such as the long-drawn debate.

=== Dissolution ===
On 16 June 2015, DAP secretary-general Lim Guan Eng announced in a statement to the media that Pakatan Rakyat had ceased to exist. DAP adviser Lim Kit Siang said the party's action was to recognise the current political reality. He added there was a need for a new political coalition based on principles, and not sheer power.

== Ideology ==
Zaid Ibrahim issued a statement on Pakatan Rakyat's ideology, stating that in government, it would introduce anti-discrimination laws, set up a social safety net, establish a new education policy aimed at producing competitive graduates, especially among the Malays and Bumiputra, repeal the Internal Security Act and Printing Presses and Publications Act, amend the Official Secrets Act and Sedition Act to limit the government's power, and reform law enforcement institutions like the courts, the Royal Malaysian Police, and the Malaysian Anti-Corruption Commission. Zaid also said that the proposed anti-discrimination law would not require the repeal or amendment of Article 153 of the Constitution.

=== Policies ===
Pakatan Rakyat basic framework policies are:

- Transparent and genuine democracy
1. Constitutional nation and rule of law
2. Separation of power
3. Free, clean, and fair election system
- Driving a high performance, sustainable, and equitable economy
1. High-skill economy
2. Decentralisation and empowerment of the states' economic management
3. Affirmative policy based on requirements
4. Labour
5. Social protection network
6. Housing
7. Infrastructure and public facilities
8. Environment
- Social justice and human development
1. Solidarity and social justice
2. Religion
3. Education
4. Women and family institutions
5. Youth
6. Security
7. Health
8. Culture
- Federal–State relationship and foreign policy
1. Federal system
2. Sabah and Sarawak
3. Foreign policy

Pakatan Rakyat further their policy through the introduction of "Orange Book", also known as Buku Jingga, which outlining the policies together with Pakatan.

=== Alternative budgets ===
By year (Malay version)

2012 · 2013 · 2014 · 2015

By year (English version)

2012 · 2013 · 2014 · 2015

== Member parties ==
- People's Justice Party (Parti Keadilan Rakyat, KeADILan/PKR)
- Democratic Action Party (Parti Tindakan Demokratik, DAP)
- Pan-Malaysian Islamic Party (Parti Islam Se-Malaysia, PAS)
- Sarawak National Party (Parti Kebangsaan Sarawak, SNAP) (2010-2011)

== Leadership ==
General Chief

No.	Name	Took office	Left office
1	Wan Azizah Wan Ismail	1 April 2008	28 August 2008
2	Anwar Ibrahim	28 August 2008	16 June 2015

Leader of the Opposition

No.	Name	Took office	Left office
1	Wan Azizah Wan Ismail	8 March 2008	28 August 2008
2	Anwar Ibrahim	28 August 2008	16 March 2015
3	Wan Azizah Wan Ismail	18 March 2015	16 June 2015

== Elected representatives ==
- Members of the Dewan Rakyat, 12th Malaysian Parliament
- List of Malaysian State Assembly Representatives (2008–13)
- Members of the Dewan Rakyat, 13th Malaysian Parliament
- List of Malaysian State Assembly Representatives (2013–18)

== Government offices ==
=== State governments ===
- Selangor (2008–2015)
- Penang (2008–2015)
- Kelantan (2008–2015)
- Perak (2008–2009)
- Kedah (2008–2013)

Note: bold as Menteri Besar/Chief Minister, italic as junior partner

== Election results ==
=== General election results ===
Election	Total seats won	Seats contested	Total votes	Share of votes	Outcome of election	Election leader
2008	82 / 222	222	3,796,464	46.75%	▲82 seats; Opposition coalition	Wan Azizah Wan Ismail; Anwar Ibrahim (de facto)
2013	89 / 222	222	5,623,984	50.87%	▲7 seats; Opposition coalition	Anwar Ibrahim

=== State election results ===
State election	State Legislative Assembly													
State election	Perlis State Legislative Assembly	Kedah State Legislative Assembly	Kelantan State Legislative Assembly	Terengganu State Legislative Assembly	Penang State Legislative Assembly	Perak State Legislative Assembly	Pahang State Legislative Assembly	Selangor State Legislative Assembly	Negeri Sembilan State Legislative Assembly	Malacca State Legislative Assembly	Johor State Legislative Assembly	Sabah State Legislative Assembly	Sarawak State Legislative Assembly	Total won / Total contested
2008	2 / 15	21 / 36	39 / 45	8 / 32	29 / 40	31 / 59	4 / 42	36 / 56	15 / 36	5 / 28	6 / 56	1 / 60		196 / 510
2011													15 / 71	15 / 69
2013	2 / 15	15 / 36	33 / 45	15 / 32	30 / 40	28 / 59	12 / 42	44 / 56	14 / 36	7 / 28	18 / 56	11 / 60		229 / 511
