= Project IC =

Citizenship process in Malaysia

Project IC is the name used in Malaysia to describe the allegation of systematic granting of citizenship to immigrants (whether legal or otherwise) by giving them identity cards and subsequently its current iteration, the MyKad. The alleged practice is centred in the state of Sabah in East Malaysia. The term is used mainly by the media as well as other political commentators and the general public. Another term used is Project M, the "M" referring to former prime minister Mahathir Mohamad due to his alleged involvement in the spearheading of the project.

The alleged object of Project IC is to alter the demographic pattern of Sabah to make it more favourable to the ruling government and certain political parties, especially with regard to changing the electoral voting patterns. Former senator and state assemblyman Chong Eng Leong alleged in 2012 that there are 700,000 "Project IC citizens" and that 200,000 of them are on the state electoral roll.

The project, in its widespread and intensive form, is suspected to have begun in the early 1990s after the entry of United Malays National Organisation (UMNO) into Sabah politics. However, there were also allegations of mass immigration and naturalisation of migrants in the 1970s under the United Sabah National Organisation (USNO) government, and in the early 1980s under BERJAYA government. On a nationwide scale, illegal immigration is a major social issue. The problem is linked with alleged phantom voters also seen in other parts of Malaysia during elections.

== Background ==
North Borneo (Sabah) together with Sarawak, Singapore, and Malaya together formed the federation of Malaysia on 16 September 1963. Sabah was multiracial state with no clear majority race, but with the Kadazan-Dusun as the largest ethnic group. Unlike other states in Peninsular Malaysia, the majority of natives or bumiputras in Sabah are non-Muslims. In 1960, the state comprised:

- 32% Kadazan-Dusuns,
- 23% Chinese,
- 15.8% Other Muslims,
- 13.1% Bajaus,
- 5.5% Indonesians,
- 4.9% Muruts,
- 1.6% Filipinos,
- 0.4% Malays.

Based on this ethnic composition, the Kadazan-Dusun dominated the political scene and the first chief minister appointed was Tun Fuad Stephens, a Kadazan-Dusun. Tun Fuad played an important role in the negotiations involving the independence of Sabah together with Tun Mustapha, a Bajau. After the formation, Tun Mustapha was made governor (Yang di-Pertua Negeri). Subsequent to this, various political parties, mostly racially based, took turns in helming government. Tun Mustapha's United Sabah National Organisation (USNO) took control of the state in 1967. The mainly Bajau Muslim party relied on Muslim votes in elections. Similarly for other Kadazan-based party or Chinese-based party, who rely on votes from their respective communities. Later, BERJAYA took control of the state. This party was more multiracial in its composition of member, but was headed by Muslim leaders such as Harris Salleh. There had been allegations of mass naturalisation of illegal immigrants during the tenure of Tun Mustapha and Harris Salleh including the deliberate classification of immigrants under the name pribumi during the reign of BERJAYA.

There was even one instance of Harris Salleh openly admitting to carrying out and planning to overwhelm the demography of Sabah in favour of Muslims. During the Royal Commission of Inquiry on illegal immigrants in Sabah in 2013, Harris Salleh also stated that the issuance of identity card and granting of citizenship to refugees were done legally in accordance with the Federal Constitution and the relevant United Nations charter. He added that Malaysia's first prime minister Tunku Abdul Rahman had announced in early 1970 that Muslim refugees can stay in Malaysia while non-Muslim refugees may prefer to go elsewhere.

Meanwhile, on a national level, politics were dominated by UMNO, a Malay-based party. Both USNO and BERJAYA had worked closely with UMNO at certain points in history. In 1985, a largely Kadazan-Dusun party, Parti Bersatu Sabah (PBS), won in the state election that year. The 1986 Sabah riots ensued in shortly after the results were announced to bring down the party president, Joseph Pairin Kitingan, as chief minister. In 1990, BERJAYA and USNO, decided to dissolve their party and form the Sabah chapter of UMNO. This party relied on membership from Muslim citizens of Sabah, be they Bajau, Suluk, Bugis, or others. The practice of naturalising immigrants was further intensified to guarantee their dominance in Sabah. They realised a great potential in altering the demography in their favour since most immigrants into Sabah were Muslims from Indonesia and southern Philippines. Later in 1994, UMNO managed to get hold of the government despite losing in the elections that year. In 2006, the estimated ethnic composition of Sabah are as follows:

- 25% Non-citizens,
- 17.76% Kadazan-Dusuns,
- 14.62% Other Bumiputras,
- 13.4% Bajaus,
- 11.48% Malays,
- 9.6% Chinese,
- 4.8% Others,
- 3.3% Muruts.

Project IC is not so concerned with the 25% of non-citizens as this denotes immigrants without Malaysian ICs. The main point of contention when comparing the statistics for 1960 and 2006 is with regard to the sharp increase of "Malays", as well as the large number of "Other Bumiputras". There is also the significant drop in the percentage of the non-Muslim population, namely, Kadazan-Dusuns, Muruts, and Chinese. After Barisan Nasional regained power in 1994, the rotation system was introduced, whereby the chief minister's post is rotated among the representatives of the three different communities in Sabah, namely, the Muslim Bumiputras, Non-Muslim Bumiputras, and the Chinese. However, after 2005, BN decided to do away with the rotation system, giving the post to UMNO's representative, led by Musa Aman. Following the 2008 state election, BN controlled the state winning 59 out of 60 state assembly seats on offer. Out of the 59 BN seats, 32 are from UMNO, while the rest are held by various predominantly non-Muslim parties.

== Modus operandi ==
The project is a complex matter involving political parties as well as government agencies including the Election Commission of Malaysia, the National Registration Department and the Immigration Department, which comes under the purview of the Ministry of Home Affairs. The suspicions and allegations on the existence of Project IC started around the mid-1990s.

In 1999, a petition was made to nullify the results of the 1999 state election for the constituency of Likas based on the thousands of dubious names found on the electoral roll. The seat was won by Sabah Progressive Party (SAPP) candidate, president, and former chief minister, Yong Teck Lee. SAPP is part of the Barisan Nasional coalition. The petitioner was Chong Eng Leong of Parti Bersatu Sabah (PBS), who lost that seat. PBS was at that time not part of the BN coalition. One of the witness at the petition was Mutalib Mohd Daud, the former Silam Umno Division Executive Secretary. Mutalib was from Peninsular Malaysia and migrated to Sabah in the 1970s. He noted at the petition that among the 43,000 newly recruited UMNO members only 14,000 had genuine identity cards.

Mutalib had written books exposing accounts of questionable granting of citizenship to foreigners. Among his books were IC Palsu: Merampas Hak Anak Sabah (1999) (Fake IC: Taking Away the Rights of Sabahans), Pengundi Untuk Disewa (Voters for Rent), IC Projek Agenda Tersembunyi Mahathir? (2006) (IC Project, Mahathir's Hidden Agenda?), and Lelaki Malaysia Terakhir (2007) (The Last Malaysian).

Another witness was UMNO's chief information officer Karim bin Ghani who was alleged to have written a letter to all UMNO branches in Sabah. The letter purportedly contained directions on the handling of Project IC. Karim claimed that he did not write the letter and that his signature was forged. The judge viewed his bare denial with deep suspicion.

The judge presiding the petition, Justice Muhammad Kamil bin Awang, ruled in favour of the petitioner and declared that the 1999 election result for Likas a nullity. He mentioned in his judgment that he had received instructions over the phone to have the petitions struck out without hearing—an instruction which he dutifully ignored.

In 2007, the former Sandakan district chief Hassnar Ebrahim made a statement confessing being involved in Project IC. He was a former detainee of the Internal Security Act in 1998. He testified in the petition for the annulment of the Likas state assembly district election in 1999. Hassnar exposed in specific details of the modus operandi of project of which he had witnessed. He mentioned a secret meeting between former Sabah chief minister Harris Salleh and federal minister Megat Junid Megat Ayub in Hong Kong. Hassnar claimed that 130,000 illegal immigrants were given ICs in 1985 alone. He also claimed that the aim of the operation was to increase the Muslim population of Sabah. DR M.

It has been said that the project was a secret policy of the Barisan Nasional (BN) coalition, in particular the United Malays National Organisation (UMNO), to attain political domination in the state using the votes of these immigrants. The immigrants are picked from those communities which would more closely resemble the Malay culture or those who would most easily be assimilated into Malay culture. Main indicators would be if the immigrants were Muslims and if they speak Malay. It was acknowledged by the judge in the 1999 Likas petition in reference to 'Ops Gembeling', that the target of the operation were the "Malays of Bugis origin".

In response to a 2007 Parliamentary Select Committee, popular Malaysian news blog Malaysia Today alleges that UMNO had made a deal with the government of Libya and the Abu Sayyaf militant Islamic group in the Philippines to bring in 1 million new Muslim voters from Philippines into Sabah.

Former Parti Keadilan Rakyat vice-president Jeffrey Kitingan alleges that there are 600,000 immigrants with ICs out of an estimated 1.7 million foreigners in Sabah. The estimated population in Sabah in 2006 was 2,997,000. Most of the foreigners in Sabah are from Indonesia and the Philippines.

== Government actions ==
Throughout the 1990s, several government officers were arrested under the Internal Security Act for their involvements in Project IC. A Parliamentary Select Committee on Integrity was set up to hear testimonies of some of the detainees in February 2007. The committee was chaired by Sabah Member of Parliament Bernard Dompok. On 16 May 2007, Dompok quit as chairman of the committee over disagreements on the function and scope of the committee, in particular, over the refusal of the National Registration Department to appear before the committee. Later on, the findings of the committee was never made public.

In May 2008, Member of Parliament (MP) Lim Kit Siang tabled a motion to set up a Royal Commission to investigate the problems relating to illegal immigrants in Sabah. The motion however was rejected by the Deputy Speaker of the Dewan Rakyat, Ronald Kiandee saying that the motion was irrelevant and was tabled at the wrong time. Several MPs from Sabah gave lukewarm response towards the proposed motion preferring instead a Parliamentary Select Committee which would necessitate the involvement of elected MPs, especially from Sabah.

Subsequently, Malaysian Prime Minister Abdullah Ahmad Badawi announced the setting up of a high powered cabinet committee chaired by Deputy Prime Minister Najib Tun Razak to resolve this matter. However, senior Sabahan politician Chong Eng Leong argued that similar committees had been set up in 2000 and 2006 without much results. The Consumers Association of Sabah and Labuan (CASH) contends that the announcement of, among others, the setting up of the cabinet committee, was a mere lip service to pacify the people of Sabah.

There has been several government crackdown operation to deport illegal immigrants since the 1990s. The latest crackdown is due to begin in August 2008. These operations will serve to deport immigrants without proper documentations such as ICs or a valid work permit. It does not serve to address the issue of Project IC.

== Royal Commission of Inquiry ==
On 1 June 2012, Prime Minister Najib Razak announced that the federal government has agreed to set up a Royal Commission of Inquiry (RCI) to investigate problems related to illegal immigration in Sabah. The Attorney-General of Malaysia was entrusted to draw the Terms of Reference (TOR) for the purpose of the commission. On 11 August 2012, the government officially announced the formation of the RCI including the members of the commission and the TORs. Political commentators have observed that the RCI appears to be a knee-jerk reaction to the defection of several prominent Sabahan BN politicians, who resigned in protest only a few days earlier because of the federal government's reluctance to deal with Sabah's immigration problems. The Royal Commission released a report absolving the Malaysian government of ever creating Project IC and blaming corrupt officials and syndicates of creating the problem.

=== Commission members ===
The commission member are as follows:

- Steve Shim (Chairman) - former Chief Judge of Sabah and Sarawak
- Saripuddin Kasim (Secretary) - Secretary General of the Domestic Trade, Cooperatives and Consumerism Ministry
- Kamaruzaman Ampon (Commissioner) - Universiti Malaysia Sabah vice-chancellor
- Herman Luping (Commissioner) - former Sabah State Attorney General
- KY Mustafa (Commissioner) - former Sabah State Secretary
- Henry Chin Poy Wu (Commissioner) - deputy chairman of the Malaysian Crime Prevention Foundation

=== Terms of Reference ===
There are 8 TORs:

- 1. To investigate the number of foreigners in Sabah given blue Malaysian ICs or citizenships;
- 2. To investigate if the award of such ICs or citizenships were according to the law;
- 3. To investigate if those given blue ICs, temporary identification receipts or citizenships through unlawful means have been registered in Sabah's electoral roll;
- 4. To investigate if the authorities have taken any action or made improvements to standard operating procedures (SOPs), methods and regulations to prevent any irregularities in accordance with the law;
- 5. To conduct a deeper probe into the SOPs, methods and regulations on the award of blue ICs or citizenships to foreigners in Sabah by taking into consideration international norms and standards that are applicable to Malaysia, and to recommend amendments or changes to improve current practices;
- 6. To investigate the reasons behind Sabah's population growth according to the following categories:

a) Sabah citizens residing in the state, including those given blue ICs or citizenships through birth certificates (late registration);

b) foreign workers (including family members);

c) illegal immigrants (including family members); and

d) fugitives

and to study their impact on the number of those registered in the electoral roll;

- 7. To investigate the social implications on the Sabah community following the award of blue ICs or citizenships to foreigners in the state; and
- 8. To investigate the number of "stateless" foreigners in Sabah given blue ICs or citizenships.

== See also ==
- Transmigration program in neighbouring Indonesia
- Internal colonialism
- Demographic threat
- Settler colonialism
- Great Replacement
