= Buku Jingga =

Malaysian political manifesto

Buku Jingga, a Malay phrase literally translated as Orange Book, was a political manifesto of the Malaysian political coalition Pakatan Rakyat, which was made up of three major component parties: Pan-Malaysian Islamic Party (PAS), People's Justice Party (PKR) and Democratic Action Party (DAP). Buku Jingga was agreed by the parties during the Second Pakatan Rakyat Convention in Penang on 19 December 2010. It acted as an alternative to Barisan Nasional's policies such as the Economic Transformation Programme, New Economic Model (NEM) and the Government Transformation Programme (GTP). Buku Jingga outlined a stand on various issues, including a 100-day reform plan. This included increases in teachers' incentives, abolishment of the highway toll system and the Internal Security Act (ISA), and the increase of royalties paid by the government to oil-producing states in Malaysia.

== Goals and Objectives ==
- A transparent and true democracy to demonstrate and accredit the supremacy of the people of Malaysia;
- A dynamic and sustainable economy to offer wealth and social benefit to all;
- Social justice to guarantee an integrated development of rights and respect of human dignity.
- Federal state and foreign policies that are based on the fundamentals of fairness and justice.

== Objectives ==
- To protect the Federal Constitution, Islam as the official religion of the Federation while other forms of non-Islamic religions can be adhered and practised freely and peacefully in the country.
- To protect the role and authority of the institution of Constitutional Monarchy.
- To uphold the use of the Malay language in correspondence to Article 152 of the Constitution and advocate the Malay language as the country's lingua franca, while preserving and strengthening the use of mother tongue for all races and of all social background, and ameliorate the command of the English language in order to improve Malaysia's global competitiveness.

== Common Policy Platform ==
These are the basic principles set out by the Pakatan Rakyat which have been put into practice in several Pakatan Rakyat controlled states in Malaysia with several key people-friendly policies to achieve distributive growth.

=== Freeing Our National Institutions ===
Pakatan Rakyat vows to:

- Extend the practice of transparent and responsible government currently advocated by Pakatan Rakyat states, to demonstrate our commitment towards freeing the nation's institutions from the undue influence of politics.
- Establish Set up a Council of Experts to develop and change existing national policies with regard to key economic, political and social challenges.
- Enhance the working of Pakatan Rakyat's Parliamentary Committees (currently tasked to shadow designated ministries), to monitor and verify the operational effectiveness of the various Ministries by publishing reports and findings once every six months.
- Provide information and educate a wider audience of the precedence of independent national institutions with integrity, co-operating with NGOs and civil society.
- Proceed to pressure on the current Government to free the nation's institutions from political conflict, through sustained campaigns and initiatives.

=== Achieving Prosperity Through a Fairer Distribution of Income ===
Pakatan Rakyat believes that hardships and poverty faced by majority of Malaysians are caused by uneven distribution of income. Therefore, it vows to:

- Create a paradigm shift in the mainstream discourse away from the obsession by the ruling party with corporate equity shareholdings to one that revolves on concrete and measurable targets that focuses on actual household income. The 30% Malay/Bumiputra equity target obsessively defended by ruling party has been seized by the very same elites defending it. These equity targets means nothing to the majority of Malays/Bumiputras, still in poverty under the regime of the ruling party. Pakatan Rakyat propose using household income targets; targets that will directly impact hundreds of thousands of Malaysian families earning less than RM1,500 per month.
- Probe and take necessary action against the exploiters of the people's wealth; stolen in the name of championing the interests of the Malays/Bumiputra, including the scandalous loss of shares worth RM52 billion allocated to the elite and cronies.
- Resume non-discriminatory direct assistance schemes for the people as a means of equitable wealth redistribution, including welfare inspired schemes such as free water, old folks and single mother assistance.
- Safeguard the people's right to petrol and basic household subsidies so long as corporate subsidies to independent power producers and concessionaires remain.
- Challenge the interest of the poorest, regardless of race with household incomes under RM1,500 per month. The party coalition strives to provide a minimum household income of RM4,000 per month for every household in Malaysia within the first 5 years of a Pakatan Rakyat government. This is achievable by way of implementing a series of policies which will raise incomes and create job opportunities to ensure that every household will be able to have more than one member in employment. These policies will include the implementation of a minimum wage, employment laws which will allow women to work from their homes, training schemes to transform and upgrade the skill-sets of the Malaysian workforce, and entrepreneurial assistance free from discrimination.
- Offer and ensure food security for all and ensure reasonable food prices, including efforts to reduce the nation's dependence on food imports. Within the first two years of taking power at federal level.

=== Increasing the People's Disposable Income ===
Pakatan Rakyat believes that there has been an incessive erosion of the rakyat's purchasing power, as inflation continues to outpace increases in salaries. In addition to promoting productivity growth, there is an increasing pressure to address the problem of rising costs which are suppressing the disposable income of the people. Productivity growth will require the development of an effective education system, the growth of investments and the promotion of R&D. This will take time to implement and achieve. However, the party coalition believes it can address unjustified high costs of utilities due to corporate monopolies and put the steps to ensure abundance of affordable housing immediately. Therefore, Pakatan Rakyat vows to:

- Re-construct four key areas of public infrastructure and utilities in order to reduce the high prices incurred by the people, by preventing concession holders from monopolies and excessive profits. The four areas of public infrastructure and utilities concerned are water, electricity, highways and broadband connectivity. Pakatan Rakyat will ensure that these utilities are either cost effectively run or competitive via effective regulations.
- Finalize the take-over of the management of the water industry in the Klang Valley in order to ensure that water tariffs remain affordable. The party will proceed the Free Water Scheme enjoyed by the rakyat thus far.
- Prevent the wholesale privatisation of the healthcare sector, as this could jeopardise the cost and quality of healthcare to the people. It will thus ensure that quality healthcare services can continue to be enjoyed by the rakyat free of charge.
- Create a National Housing Board to oversee, develop and manage a people-centric housing development scheme. This will ensure that every family in Malaysia can afford to own a comfortable dwelling at a price commensurate with their income.
- Quickly solve outstanding cases of abandoned housing projects which continue to oppress the rakyat, by any means thought appropriate by the Pakatan Rakyat state governments. Thus far, Pakatan Rakyat governments have already begun to rejuvenate housing projects involving some 3,000 homes.
- Pursue and further expand micro-credit schemes introduced to help the poorest improve their economic position, through financial aid, training and effective implementation. Thus far, RM70 million has already been allocated for various micro-credit schemes in the Pakatan Rakyat states.

=== Transparency Empowering the People ===
Besides that, Pakatan Rakyat thinks that the people possess the right to monitor the effectiveness of any government – to ensure good and clean administration. Pakatan Rakyat vows to:

- Proceed the empowerment of the people as a check and balance mechanism by practising complete transparency of government and information. This will comprise the complete implementation of the Freedom of Information Enactments already introduced in Pakatan Rakyat states.
- Extend support for civil society through increased assistance to NGOs which champion the rakyat's interests, as part of the overall effort to strengthen the role of NGOs as the voice of the rakyat.

=== Emphasizing Education and Educators ===
Recognising the immense contribution of the educators towards the nation's development and social solidarity, Pakatan Rakyat vows to:

- Offer direct funding to all types of educational institutions - at all levels and for academic, technical and vocational streams - in order to expand access to effective education for Malaysians of all walks of life. Aside from that, educators are the core of the Malaysian education system and the party would offer them direct assistance programmes, as recognition of their key role and their noble sacrifices and unrelenting service in nation building.
- Standardize the pay of educators using the principle of fair assessment with consideration to expertise and length of service.
- Implement a salary scheme with a fair and comprehensive assessment system for teachers which will be on par with that of engineers, accountants and doctors. This is our firm commitment to establish a quality education system. In addition, reassess current deployments in schools to ensure that all teachers are fully trained and qualified, including a resolution of the status of temporary teachers.
- Curtail the bureaucratic and administrative burden faced by Malaysian educators. The ruling party's constant cycle of new education policies and its emphasis on administrative perfection and complete reports has come at the expense of time which would have been better spent in educating our future generations.

=== A Culture of Knowledge is the Core of our Universities ===
Under regime of Barisan Nasional, Pakatan Rakyat believes that Malaysian universities are trapped in a crisis of credibility and quality. This is a pressing and major problem for the nation. Aside from that, Pakatan Rakyat believes that no further time can be wasted, and that urgent and specific attention is needed, with a concerted effort to restore the standard of the varsities. Therefore, Pakatan Rakyat vows to:

- Reinstate intellectual and academic freedom to the universities, by ending all forms of political interference in their administration.
- Form a Selection Panel, staffed by experts, to shortlist and assess the suitability of candidates to lead the universities. The party shall ensure that the best possible candidates are placed at the head of our universities. Furthermore, the party are obligated to the principle of academic meritocracy in various varsities.
- Strongly advocate the students’ struggle to repeal the university and University College Act and restore the right of university students to express themselves and engage fully in political thoughts and activities.
- Deal the funding crisis in higher education. PTPTN's deficit is projected to reach a stratospheric RM46 billion within a decade. The party would minimise the financial burden of student loans by offering interest-free schemes and allowing repayments to start six months after entering full-time employment.
- Assure the right of every qualified Malaysian to obtain tertiary and further education at minimal cost.
- Revive the people's right to educational scholarships, as enshrined in the Federal Constitution, for those who are deserving. The party vows to limit the need for costly private education.

=== Combating Corruption ===
Identifying the widespread destructive trends wrought by corruption upon the nation, Pakatan Rakyat vows to:

- Allocate the administration of the Malaysian Anti-Corruption Commission (MACC) under the supervision of Parliament, including the appointment of MACC's most senior positions.
- Dispatch an all-out anti-corruption ‘war’ at state level. This would include tightening government procedures and administrative mechanisms.
- Provide legal services to defend any individual who exposes a corruption scandal, without regard for political affiliation. This is to encourage more people to come forward and play their part in the fight against corruption.
- Proceed implementing the practice of open tenders, including the implementation of new steps with checks and balances in supply chain management. These are aimed at stamping out all forms of corruption.

=== Sabah and Sarawak as Equal Partners ===
Recognizing the position of Sabah and Sarawak as equal partners in the Malaysian Federation, and honouring previous agreements made, Pakatan Rakyat vows to:

- Reinstate autonomy to Sabah and Sarawak in line with and within the framework of the Federal Constitution and the Federation Agreement.
- Increase the royalties paid on petroleum and hydrocarbon resources to Sabah and Sarawak to 20% from the present 5%.
- Establish a Royal Commission to solve the chronic problem of illegal immigration and citizenship in Sabah.
- Assist bring the level of infrastructural development in Sabah and Sarawak up to par with other states of the Federation.
- Promote national integration between Sabah, Sarawak and Peninsular Malaysia through a fair power-sharing arrangement that fully upholds the spirit of the Federation.

== First 100-Days Reform ==
1. Amend various public institutions, such as the Election Commission of Malaysia, the Malaysian Anti-Corruption Commission, the Attorney General of Malaysia and the Royal Malaysian Police to introduce transparency and reinstate accountability of the government.
2. Abolish the Internal Security Act.
3. Direct Khazanah Nasional Berhad, the Employees' Provident Fund (EPF) and all other government organisation that possess highway concessions to complete the transference of such highway assets to the government with the purpose of abolishing tolls.
4. Alter the structure of national subsidies (such as the gas subsidies of RM 19 billion to independent power producers) and transferring these savings towards the subsidies of the people.
5. Acknowledge the roles and contributions of civil servants by re-assessing the salary structures; starting with an increase in teacher's salaries by RM 500 per teacher per month as an acknowledgement of the importance of their role as educators in nation-building.
6. Restore all private water concessions to the government, which would make water a public resource of the people.
7. Distribute free Wi-Fi internet services to all Malaysians living in the urban and semi-urban areas.
8. Dismiss FELDA Plantations to redistribute its estate lands to the second and third generations of the FELDA settlers.
9. Increase oil royalties to Sabah, Sarawak, Terengganu and Kelantan to 20%.
10. Form a Royal Commission to thoroughly investigate the problems of illegal immigration and citizenship in Sabah.

== Government position ==
Malaysia's Prime Minister, Datuk Seri Najib Tun Razak, has dismissed Buku Jingga as "not worth the paper it is printed on". In a speech on 31 September, he said that Pakatan's masterplan which amongst others aimed to restructure subsidies and abolish tolls was not feasible, arguing that doing so would spell the end of Bursa Malaysia since most of the concessionaires are public-listed companies. He said as well that Pakatan's promise to wipe out the National Higher Education Fund Corporation's (PTPTN) RM33bil debt was also not doable.

=== PAS Hudud Vs Pakatan Rakyat Buku Jingga ===
One of the component parties of Pakatan Rakyat, PAS, explicitly states that its mission is to create an Islamic state guided by Islamic principles. As such, UMNO Kelantan delegate Mohd Afandi Yusoff has criticised Buku Jingga for not including hudud law, accusing PAS of abandoning their Islamic principles.
