= Royal Commission of Inquiry on illegal immigrants in Sabah =

The Royal Commission of Inquiry on illegal immigrants in Sabah was formed on 11 August 2012 to investigate the problems relating to citizenship and immigrants in the state of Sabah in Malaysia. The inquiry is closely related to Project IC, the alleged systematic granting of citizenship to foreigners.

== Background ==
On 1 June 2012, Prime Minister Najib Razak announced that the federal government has agreed to set up a Royal Commission of Inquiry (RCI) to investigate problems related to illegal immigration in Sabah. The Attorney-General of Malaysia was entrusted to draw the Terms of Reference (TOR) for the purpose of the commission. On 11 August 2012, the government officially announced the formation of the RCI including the members of the commission and the TORs. Political commentators have observed that the RCI appears to be a knee-jerk reaction to the defection of several prominent Sabahan BN politicians, who resigned in protest only a few days earlier because of the federal government's reluctance to deal with Sabah's immigration problems.

The commission began its public hearings on 14 January 2013.

=== Members ===
The commission member are as follows:

- Tan Sri Steve Shim (Chairman) – former Chief Judge of Sabah and Sarawak
- Datuk Saripuddin Kasim (Secretary) – Secretary General of the Domestic Trade, Cooperatives and Consumerism Ministry
- Datuk Dr. Kamaruzaman Ampon (Commissioner) – former Universiti Malaysia Sabah vice-chancellor
- Tan Sri Datuk Seri Panglima Herman Luping (Commissioner) – former Sabah State Attorney General
- Datuk KY Mustafa (Commissioner) – former Sabah State Secretary
- Datuk Henry Chin Poy Wu (Commissioner) – deputy chairman of the Malaysian Crime Prevention Foundation

=== Terms of Reference ===
There are 8 TORs:

- 1. To investigate the number of foreigners in Sabah given blue Malaysian ICs or citizenships;
- 2. To investigate if the award of such ICs or citizenships were according to the law;
- 3. To investigate if those given blue ICs, temporary identification receipts or citizenships through unlawful means have been registered in Sabah’s electoral roll;
- 4. To investigate if the authorities have taken any action or made improvements to standard operating procedures (SOPs), methods and regulations to prevent any irregularities in accordance with the law;
- 5. To conduct a deeper probe into the SOPs, methods and regulations on the award of blue ICs or citizenships to foreigners in Sabah by taking into consideration international norms and standards that are applicable to Malaysia, and to recommend amendments or changes to improve current practices;
- 6. To investigate the reasons behind Sabah’s population growth according to the following categories:

a) Sabah citizens residing in the state, including those given blue ICs or citizenships through birth certificates (late registration);

b) foreign workers (including family members);

c) illegal immigrants (including family members); and

d) fugitives

and to study their impact on the number of those registered in the electoral roll;

- 7. To investigate the social implications on the Sabah community following the award of blue ICs or citizenships to foreigners in the state; and
- 8. To investigate the number of “stateless” foreigners in Sabah given blue ICs or citizenships.

== Proceedings ==
=== Response ===
Former Sabah chief minister Harris Salleh testified in the inquiry that the final authority to grant citizenship to foreigners is with the federal government. He also denied the existence of Project IC.

Former Malaysian prime minister Mahathir Mohamad admitted that Filipino immigrants were granted citizenship in Sabah, but insists that everything was done legally.

Former Sabah National Registration Department (NRD) deputy director Mohd Nasir Sugip told the commission that the former Sabah Election Commission director had ordered Sabah NRD to register 16,000 immigrants. He also added that the NRD and EC had collaborated to increase the number of Muslim voters in Sabah.

Dissident blogger Raja Petra Kamarudin wrote in Malaysia Today that there is a plot by the Barisan Nasional government to increase the Muslim population in Sabah to retain power in the state.

=== List of hearings sessions ===
The Royal Commission of Inquiry start its first hearing session began on 14 January 2013

Date	Title	Public hearing / Government Body

== Conclusion ==
=== Report findings ===
The Royal Commission after going through a nine months of hearings and 211 witnesses, released a 366-page report. In the report several statements and recommendations were made:

- Project IC may have existed.
- Political parties were not involved in the granting of citizenship to illegals.
- Corrupt officials were partly at fault.
- A permanent committee or secretariat should be set up to oversee the problem of illegal immigrants in Sabah.

=== Sabah RCI Roundtable ===
The Jeffrey Cheah Institute held a roundtable discussion on 17th Dec to discuss the RCI Report. Moderated by Prof James Chin, a well-known political scientist, two senior Sabah politicians took part. They were:

- Datuk Madius Tangau, Acting President, United Pasokmomogun Kadazandusun Murut Organisation (UPKO)
- YB Darrel Leiking, PKR Vice-President and MP for Penampang

The webcast can be seen here
