= Political positions of Mahathir Mohamad =

Views of the Malaysian prime minister

Mahathirism Mahathirisme
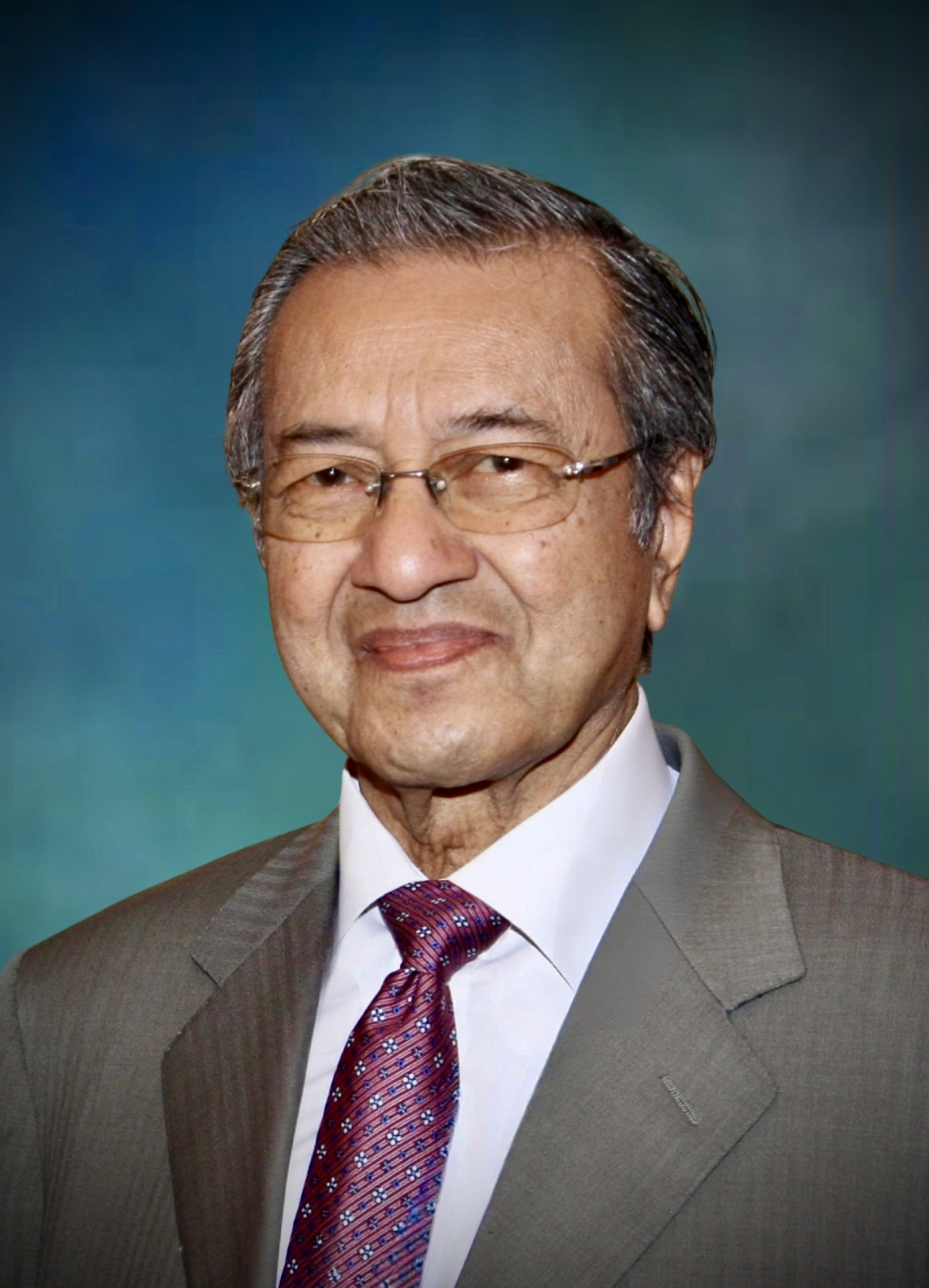
- Ideology: Authoritarianism Anti-royalism; Anti-imperialism; Asian Values; Third-Worldism; Nationalism; Malay nationalism; Nativism; Ketuanan Melayu; Populism; Pragmatism; Factions: Islamism; Islamic modernism; Islamic liberalism
- Religion: Islam

Mahathir Mohamad, the 4th and 7th prime minister of Malaysia's political views have shifted during his lengthy career. Support for "Asian values," liberal Islam and Malay nationalism have long been part of Mahathir's political ideals. He has long been a critic of the foreign policy of the United States and other Western nations. Mahathirism has had an influence over subsequent Malaysian administrations.

== Overview ==
During the 1980s, he was a supporter of Third-Worldism, while during other periods he has been a proponent of "Asian values" and globalization. Mahathir is a vocal critic of neoliberalism and the Western world. However, he is also considered an authoritarian-neoliberal. In 2011, Mahathir suggested that the September 11 attacks might have been staged by the United States government. Mahathir condemned the Universal Declaration of Human Rights in 1997, suggesting it be revised to place greater importance on economic growth over civil liberties.

A Muslim thinker, he holds Islamic political views. In 2002, he characterised himself as an Islamic fundamentalist. Mahathir is generally respected in developing and Islamic countries, particularly due to his oversight of Malaysia's economic growth and his support of liberal Muslim values.

He has been described as anti-royalist by Libération, owing to his efforts to oppose immunity for members of Malaysia's monarchies.

== Malay nationalism ==
Mahathir has been described as a proponent of Malay nationalism. In The Malay Dilemma, he argued that the Malay race had been marginalised, and voiced his support for affirmative action policies for them. Upon his first resignation, he expressed his disappointment at the progress made towards his "principle task" of supporting the Malay race. In 2021, Mahathir said he did not believe in "Ketuanan Melayu", calling it a "fantasy", and said instead that he believed in "Bangsa Malaysia".

== Environmentalism ==
Mahathir has advocated for a balance between environmental protection and natural resource use for economic growth. He referred to the outcomes of the Earth Summit as "eco-imperialism", arguing that Global North countries put an undue burden on Global South countries for environmental degradation. In response to international scrutiny, he said in 2019 that linking palm oil production to deforestation was "baseless, unfair and unjustified" and that the Malaysian palm oil sector had developed sustainably.

== Antisemitism ==
We (Muslims) are actually very strong. 1.3 billion people cannot be simply wiped out. The Europeans killed 6 million Jews out of 12 million. But today the Jews rule the world by proxy. They get others to fight and die for them.

— Mahathir, 2003

Mahathir has made many antisemitic statements throughout his political career. In 2020, Mary J. Ainslie of the University of Nottingham Ningbo China said that labeling Mahathir as antisemitic is "a little simplistic", adding, "While he expresses anti-Semitic views he also stereotypes other people and races to a significant extent (Chinese, Indians, Western people, even Malays themselves), and so scholars speculate that he is probably more accurately labeled a social Darwinist."

In The Malay Dilemma, he wrote that "Jews are not merely hook-nosed, but understand money instinctively". In August 1983, Mahathir claimed in a speech that Jews control the international media. In March 1994, he banned the screening of Schindler's List on the grounds that he viewed it as anti-German, pro-Jewish propaganda. During the collapse of the ringgit and the economic crisis in 1997, he made a series of remarks blaming Jews, in particular George Soros, a Jewish "agenda", and "an international Jewish conspiracy" attempting to destroy the economies of Muslim countries.

During an Organization of Islamic Cooperation summit held in Kuala Lumpur in 2003, he accused Jews of "ruling the world by proxy" and getting "others to fight and die for them". His speech was denounced by President George W. Bush. In 2012, he claimed he was "glad to be labelled antisemitic". In an interview with Al Jazeera in 2016, Mahathir conflated all Jews with the State of Israel and reaffirmed his statement that Jews rule the world by proxy and that they get others to die and fight for them.

In a 2018 interview with the Associated Press, Mahathir said, "'Anti-Semitic' is a term that is invented to prevent people from criticizing the Jews for doing wrong things." He later said in a BBC HARDtalk interview that "[Jews] are hook-nosed. Many people called the Malays fat-nosed. We didn't object, we didn't go to war for that", and disputed the number of Jews killed in the Holocaust.

In 2019, when asked why he had previously claimed that Jews are "inclined towards money", he responded that he had Jewish friends, and that "they are not like the other Jews, that's why they are my friends." Mahathir has defended his comments about Jews as an exercise of free speech, and by claiming that "the Jews do a lot of wrong things which force us to pass comment."

== LGBT rights ==
Mahathir opposes an expansion of LGBT rights in Malaysia. In 2001, Mahathir said that any homosexual ministers from the United Kingdom would be barred from entering Malaysia. During an October 2018 lecture to university students in Bangkok, Mahathir contrasted Malaysian values with those of Western nations and cited "the institution of marriage [and] the family" in his opposition to LGBT rights.

== Foreign affairs ==
In 2020, Mahathir expressed support for Joe Biden in the 2020 United States presidential election, saying that the re-election of Donald Trump would be a "disaster".

In a July 2025 interview with Al Jazeera, Mahathir said that Israel's killing of the Palestinian people during the Gaza war would be remembered for "centuries", and described it as a genocide that paralleled the Holocaust and the killing of Muslims during the Bosnian War. He also expressed support for a two-state solution in the Israeli–Palestinian conflict.
