= PAP–UMNO relations =

Bilateral relation between political parties

The relationship between the People's Action Party (PAP) of Singapore and the United Malays National Organisation (UMNO) of Malaysia has been a defining feature of the political history of both countries. The PAP has governed Singapore continuously since 1959, while UMNO led Malaysia's Alliance Party and later the Barisan Nasional (BN) coalition from 1955 until its electoral defeat in 2018. Despite this loss, UMNO ministers have continued to be highly influential in Malaysian politics and continues to serve in the cabinet as part of coalition governments. The proximity of the two countries and their shared historical experiences have ensured that PAP–UMNO relations has had a significant influence on Malaysia–Singapore relations.

The origins of the relationship can be traced to the period of decolonisation and the events leading to Singapore's merger with Malaya in 1963 as part of the Malaysia Agreement. While both parties cooperated initially and shared opposition to the communist insurgency, ideological divisions soon emerged. The PAP's advocacy for a "Malaysian Malaysia" that promoted equal treatment for all races conflicted with UMNO's policy of affirmative action favouring the Malays as part of Ketuanan Melayu (lit. Malay Overlordship or Malay Supremacy). The tension intensified when both sides decided to contest elections in their respective arenas. These developments eroded trust and contributed to the breakdown of the political alliance.

After Singapore's separation from Malaysia in 1965, the relationship between the PAP and UMNO has remained marked by periodic disputes over trade, migration, media coverage and symbolic gestures. However, the parties have also demonstrated a pragmatic capacity for cooperation, particularly in matters of security, infrastructure and regional diplomacy. Although tensions occasionally resurface, the level of hostility has generally diminished over the decades. Both countries have pursued distinct political and economic paths, reflecting their divergent national priorities while maintaining a functional bilateral relationship.

== Origins ==
Both parties were formed during the period of anti-colonial resentment following the Japanese occupation. They initially admitted communist ex-insurgents as allies against colonialism, and co-operated to form an independent Malaysia (including Singapore and the Borneo States) in 1963. Both also became hostile to the Malayan Communist Party (MCP) and Indonesian Communist Party (PKI), expelled leftists from their ranks, and confronted the communist insurgency and Indonesia in the 1950s.

== Overview ==
=== Formation of Malaysia ===
After Malayan independence, the PAP and UMNO-led governments of Singapore and Malaya began negotiating a merger of their respective territories in 1960. Initially, Tunku Abdul Rahman, the prime minister of Malaya, refused. But fears that the MCP would seize Singapore and use it as a base against Malaya led him to relent. Singapore additionally sought complete independence from Britain, and a guaranteed common market.

On 24 April 1961 Lee Kuan Yew proposed a united Malaysia to Tunku Abdul Rahman, after which Tunku invited Lee to prepare a paper elaborating the idea. On 9 May, Lee sent the final version of the paper to Tunku and then deputy Malayan Prime Minister Abdul Razak. In the paper, Lee wrote : "Therefore, a plan to create a federation of these three territories must be tactfully and gradually introduced into the minds of the peoples of the three territories, and should be presented as a desire of the peoples living in this region, and not initiated by the British." There were doubts about the practicality of the idea but Lee assured the Malayan government of continued Malay political dominance in the new federation. Razak supported the idea of the new federation and worked to convince Tunku to back it.

Singapore became part of Malaysia after referendum, on the condition that all citizens of Singapore would become Malaysian citizens. Singapore would also retain autonomy in areas such as labour and education, and the right to maintain English, Mandarin, Malay and Tamil as official languages. The Federation of Malaysia was established on 16 September 1963 under those conditions.

=== Ideological differences ===
Initially, all appeared well. However, both nations developed different ideological lines on racial issues. The UMNO sought to promote affirmative action for Malays through the bumiputera (literally, 'native') policy, and argued that especially rural Malays were economically disadvantaged by the presence of mainly overseas Chinese immigrants, who had arrived during British colonial rule and started urban businesses.

The PAP regarded these programmes as racially discriminatory, and held that that Singaporean Chinese were facing increasing political, legal, and economic discrimination. One proposal was that the PAP should join the UMNO-led federal government, but the Malayan Chinese Association (MCA) feared that the PAP would replace them, and opposed the PAP, seeing it as a radical socialist movement. The MCA urged the UMNO to prevent the PAP from becoming too influential in the federal government. From this point, hostility grew.

=== Conflict between the parties ===
During this period, racial tensions grew between the Chinese and the Malays. The UMNO initially blamed the MCP (e.g. during the Hock Lee bus riots), but came also to blame the PAP. This was not an unfounded allegation, as many Malay newspapers, such as the partisan newspaper Utusan Melayu, continued to allege that the PAP had been mistreating the Malay race, citing the relocation of Malays from the kampungs for redevelopment. An increasingly heated debate on both sides sprung up, inciting racial tensions to such an extent that race riots occurred, culminating with two riots on and after the Prophet Muhammad's birthday in 1964.

Both parties continued to escalate the tension with scathing verbal attacks on each other, accusing each other of being the cause of the riots. In what was seen by the PAP as a violation of previous agreements to confine their political role to their respective states, the Singapore branch of UMNO (SUMNO) competed in the 1963 state elections in Singapore on 21 September 1963 as part of the Singapore Alliance Party. Despite failing to win any seats, even in Malay-dominant constituencies, it was seen as an attack on the PAP's power base.

Eventually, the PAP decided to challenge the policies of the central Government directly, both as a retaliatory measure and to further its ideological grounds. It stood nine candidates in the April 1964 Malaysian federal elections in coalition with other parties under the Malaysian Solidarity Council. The PAP was now a legitimate opposition party in the federal elections, and campaigned on a platform of eliminating racialism and a Malaysian Malaysia. Their rallies attracted large crowds. They decided to contest a minority of the seats however, to avoid any perception that they were trying to undermine the ruling party or being seen as agents of instability. The PAP would win one seat at Bangsar by Devan Nair.

UMNO saw this as spite, and felt threatened by the fact that the PAP had even contested any seats at all, and was alarmed by the seat the PAP managed to win. The sharp highlight of the degenerating situation was a vow by UMNO to oust the PAP from the Singapore government when the next set of state elections occurred, perhaps before the PAP could do likewise at the next federal election.

In addition to racial unrest, thorny issues concerning Singapore's rights as an autonomous state further put a dent in relations, such as the failure of a common market to be set up between the Federation and Singapore, and the heavy tax burden placed on Singapore, which was seen as unfair. Such issues catalysed the impending secession: On 7 August 1965, Tunku Abdul Rahman announced to the Malaysian Parliament in Kuala Lumpur that the Parliament should vote yes on the resolution to have Singapore expelled from the Federation, choosing to "sever all ties with a State Government that showed no measure of loyalty to its Central Government" as opposed to the undesirable method of suppressing the PAP for its actions which was supported by Ultras. Singapore's separation and independence became official on 9 August 1965. The remnants of the PAP in Malaya were renamed the Democratic Action Party (DAP), which it also charted its own trajectory and relations with UMNO in post-1965 Malaysian politics.

== Post-separation ==
The complex relationship continued with the issue of trade and other agreements between the now separate entities of Malaysia and Singapore. At times both parties have heavily criticised each other for their policies, to the extent of issuing threats. Since 1970, both have had their countries issue bans on the physical distribution on newspaper media of the other country (by refusing to issue newspaper or publishing permits); for example, Malaysian newspapers such as the New Straits Times and Utusan Malaysia are banned from mass printed circulation in Singapore, whilst corresponding newspapers from Singapore such as The Straits Times are banned from mass printed circulation in Malaysia (though as recent as June 2005 there have been talks to lift the bans on both sides of the Causeway). This heavy exchange of words is epitomised by the former prime ministers of both countries, Lee Kuan Yew of the PAP, and Mahathir Mohamad of the UMNO. Nevertheless, at present, with the advent of the Internet, social media and relative non-interference in each other's internal political affairs, Malaysian and Singaporean online news portals are readily and freely accessible on the Internet for viewing within both countries, without censorship and without the need of the likes of virtual private network to circumvent the censorship of foreign media.

According to Singaporean sources, following the split Tunku offered any Malay Singaporeans who wished to move to Malaysia 10 acres of land in Johor. However, this offer was not taken up.

PAP–UMNO relations were volatile at several points in history, and there are still long-running disputes. However, Malaysia and Singapore remain relatively close allies. The two countries' relations with each other are stronger than their (generally warm) relations with other countries in the region, such as the members of Southeast Asian regional-bloc ASEAN. For example, there is a strong co-operation for law enforcement on both sides of the Causeway, whereby fugitives wanted by Singapore law enforcement and who escaped to Malaysia were detained by Malaysian law enforcement and then extradited back to Singapore. In 2025, Ahmad Zahid Hamidi, the President of UMNO, attended Singapore's diamond jubilee celebrations marking the 60th anniversary of its independence from Malaysia as part of the National Day parade.

== See also ==
- Malaysia–Singapore relations
