= Ketuanan Melayu =

Political concept in Malaysia

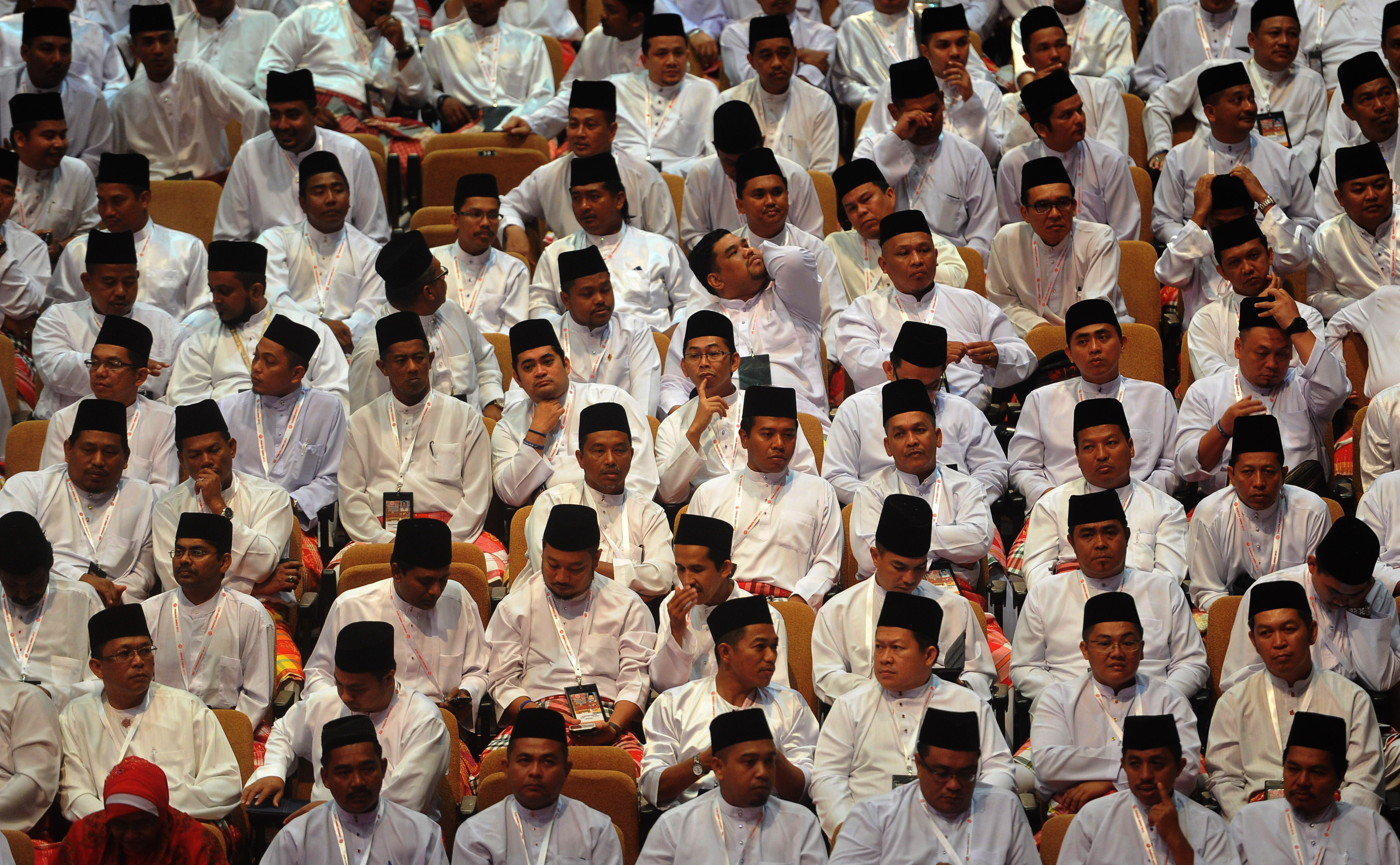
Malay preeminence has been at the centre of Malaysian politics since before the formation of Malaya.

Ketuanan Melayu (Jawi: کتوانن ملايو; lit. "Malay overlordship" or "Malay supremacy") is a political concept that emphasises Malay hegemony and preeminence in present-day Malaysia. The Malaysian Malays have claimed special position and rights owing to their longer history in the area and the fact that the present Malaysian state itself evolved from a Malay polity. The oldest political institution in Malaysia is the system of Malay rulers of the nine Malay states. Between the late 18th and the mid-20th century, British colonial authorities in British Malaya, transformed the system first into a system of indirect rule, then in 1948, using this culturally based institution, they incorporated the Malay monarchy into the blueprints for the independent Federation of Malaya.

The term Tanah Melayu (Malaya) in its name, which literally means "Malay land", assumes proprietorship of the Malay states. In this method, the colonial government strengthened Malay ethno-nationalism, Malay ethnicity and culture and Malay sovereignty in the new nation-state. Though other cultures would continue to flourish, the identity of the emerging political community was to be shaped by the political culture of its dominant Malay ethnic group. The Chinese and Indian immigrants, who form a significant minority in Malaysia, are considered beholden to the Malays for granting them citizenship in return for special privileges as set out in Article 153 of the Constitution of Malaysia. In return, the King of Malaysia bears the responsibility to safeguard the legitimate interests of these communities as provisioned in the Federal Constitution. This quid pro quo arrangement is usually referred to as the Malaysian social contract. The concept of is often cited by politicians, particularly those from the United Malays National Organisation (UMNO) and Malaysian Islamic Party (PAS).

== History ==
Broader Malay nationalist ideas had already taken root in the 1940s, when Malays mobilised against the Malayan Union imposed by the British and later during the struggle for independence. In the 1960s, Malay nationalism was openly challenged by the People's Action Party (PAP) of Singapore, then a state within Malaysia from 1963 to 1965, as well as by the Democratic Action Party (DAP) following Singapore's expulsion. However, constitutional provisions linked to Malay nationalism were later made entrenched after the 13 May incident, which followed an election campaign centred on non-Malay rights and ethnic politics. This era also marked the further rise of "ultras", who pushed for a Malay supremacist one-party state under UMNO and reinforced the notion that Malays were the definitive people of Malaysia, implying that only an ethnic Malay could be considered a true Malaysian. The term Ketuanan Melayu itself only became widely used in the early 2000s. For much of its history, organised political resistance to the idea largely came from non-Malay based parties, notably the Malaysian People's Movement Party (Gerakan) and the Democratic Action Party (DAP). In the same period, the multiracial People's Justice Party (PKR) rejected Ketuanan Melayu and instead promoted the idea of Ketuanan Rakyat, or the supremacy of the people.

The 13 May incident caused a major change in the government's approach to racial issues in successive decades, and led to the introduction of aggressive affirmative action policies strongly favouring the Malays, known as the New Economic Policy (NEP). The National Culture Policy, also introduced in 1970, emphasised the assimilation of non-Malay natives (collectively known as the bumiputera) into the Malay ethnic group. During the 1990s, Prime Minister Mahathir Mohamad toned down this approach, with his Bangsa Malaysia policy emphasising a Malaysian instead of Malay identity for the state, although preferential treatment towards the Malays was retained. Since the 2010s, politicians particularly from the Malaysian United Indigenous Party (BERSATU) and the Malaysian Islamic Party (PAS) began re-emphasising the phrase, as they deemed such rights as being threatened under a Pakatan Harapan (PH)–led government, and publicly chastised government ministers from the coalition who questioned the concept as being in violation of the supposed social contract. Although still subscribing to the philosophy, UMNO has taken a less hardline approach since the 2020s, softening ties with former enemies such as DAP and PKR by getting into coalition governments, although some factions continue to advocate for a more aggressive and traditional approach to the concept.

== Malaysian Malays ==
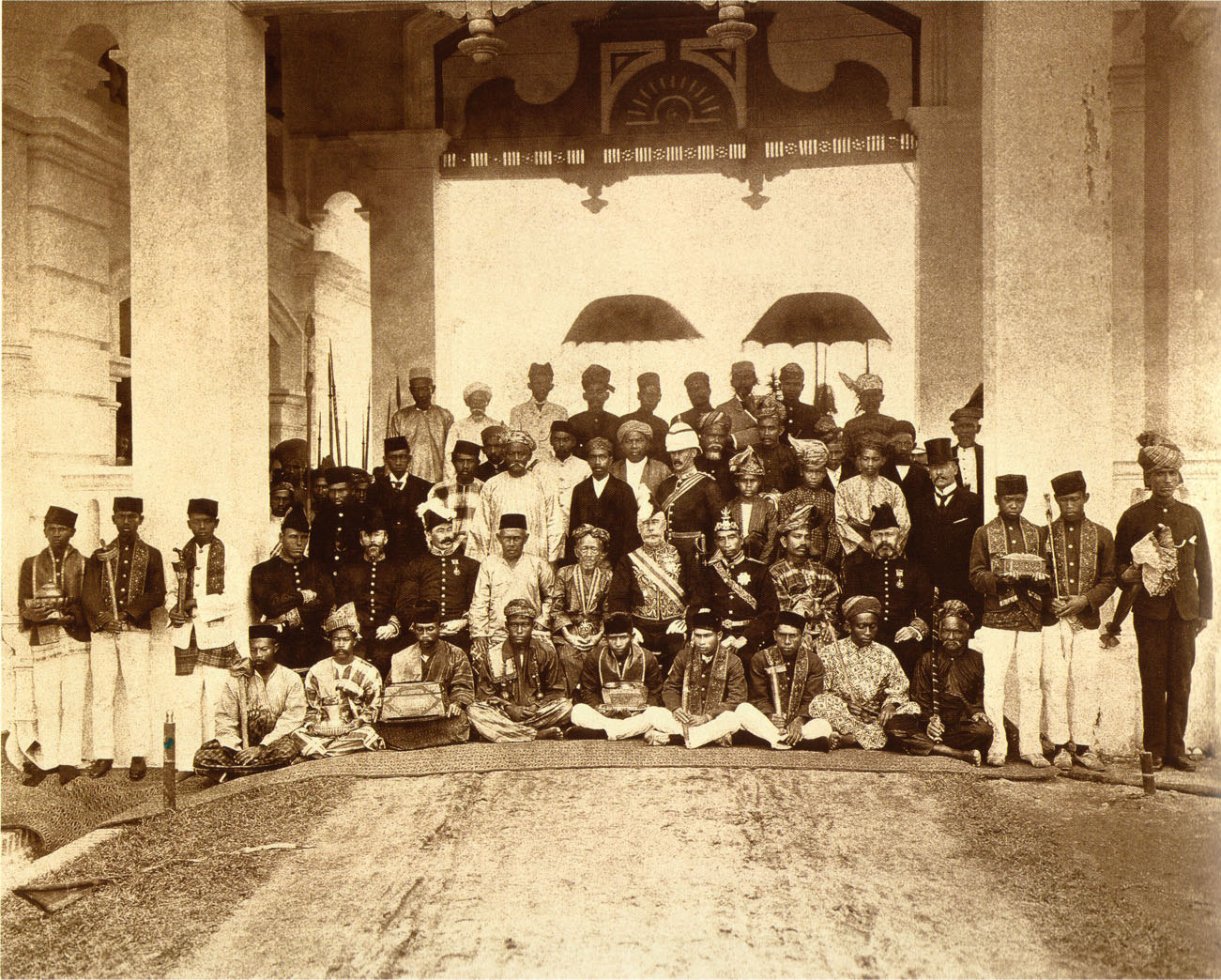
The British recognised the Malay Rulers as sovereign over Malaya.

Ethnic Malays which make up the majority population of Malaysia at 70.4%, are an ethnic group of Austronesian peoplepredominantly inhabiting the Malay Peninsula, including the southernmost parts of Thailand, the east coast of Sumatra, the coast of Borneo, and the smaller islands which lie between these locations. The true origin of ethnic Malays is still the subject of studies among historians, anthropologists and linguists. A popular theory suggested that the people who spoke Austronesian languages first arrived in Maritime Southeast Asia between 2,500BCE and 1,500BCE, as a part of Austronesian expansion from Taiwan to Southeast Asia.

However, a recent genetic studies carried out by HUGO (Human Genome Organisation) involving almost 2,000 people across Asia, points to another theory of Asian migration pattern. The HUGO findings support the hypothesis that Asia was populated primarily through a single migration event from the south and that the South East Asian region was populated first which contained the most diversity, then continuing slowly North with its diversity being lost.

Hindu and Buddhist influences arrived through trade contacts with the Indian subcontinent. The beginning of the first Millennium saw the rise of ancient Malay states in the coastal areas of Malay Peninsula, notably the Red Earth Kingdom (1st century), Gangga Negara (2nd century), Langkasuka (2nd century), Kedah (2nd century) and Pahang (5th century). Between 7th and 13th centuries, many of these small, often prosperous peninsular maritime trading states became part of the Srivijaya empire, a kingdom centred in Palembang, Sumatra.

By the 15th century, the Malacca Sultanate, whose hegemony reached over much of the western Malay archipelago, had become the centre of Islamization in the east. The Malaccan tradition was transmitted onwards and fostered a vigorous ethos of Malay identity. Since this era, the Islamic faith became closely identified with Malay society and played a significant role in defining the Malay identity. The close identification of the Malays with Islam continued until the 20th century and was finally entrenched in the Article 160 of the Constitution of Malaysia as well as in the national philosophy of Brunei known as the Malay Islamic Monarchy.

The present-day Malaysian Malays are divided broadly into "Malays proper" or "Peninsular Malays" (Melayu Anak Jati or Melayu Semenanjung) and "foreign Malays" or "Islander Malay" (Melayu Anak Dagang or "Melayu Kepulauan"). The Malays proper consist of those individuals who adhere to the Malay culture which has developed in the Malay Peninsula. Among notable groups are Kedahan Malays, Kelantanese Malays and Terengganuan Malays. The foreign Malays consist of descendants of immigrants from other part of Malay Archipelago who became the citizens of the Malay sultanates and were absorbed and assimilated into Malay culture at different times, aided by similarity in lifestyle and common religion (Islam). Among notable groups are the Javanese, Minangkabau and Bugis Malays.

Article 160 of the Constitution of Malaysia defines a Malay as a Malaysian citizen born to a Malaysian citizen who professes to be a Muslim, habitually speaks the Malay language, adheres to Malay customs, and is domiciled in Malaysia or Singapore. Though this definition is not according to ancestry lineage, it is however correct in the sense of social behaviours. Culture, which controls a great proportion of general mentality and social behaviour, is succeeded through the mother tongue and religion. Article 160 unites Malays from different ethnic groups as the prevailing race and thus embraces them with the political prowess to dominate and rule over other races: Chinese, Indians, Kadazan, Iban, Orang Asli etc. This is also apparent from the name of UMNO (United Malays National Organisation), who are a staunch political proponent of this role.

== Pre-independence ==
=== Early Malay nationalism ===
Malay nationalism as an organised political movement existed since the invasion by foreign powers. However, the ethnic Chinese and Indian immigrants, forming a minority of the population, did not see themselves as Malayans. A report by the Permanent Under-Secretary of State for the Colonies in the early 1930s found that "the number of non-Malays who have adopted Malaya as their home is only a very small proportion of the whole population".

Although the British effectively held de facto control over Malaya, de jure the country was governed by the Malays themselves, and merely being temporarily administered by the British. The High Commissioner, Sir Hugh Clifford made a speech outlining the British ideology during their rule in Malaysia, in which he urged "everyone in this country [to] be mindful of the fact that this is a Malay country, and we British came here at the invitation of Their Highnesses the Malay Rulers, and it is our duty to help the Malays to rule their own country."

The colonial authorities adopted an open "Pro-Malay" policy so the Malays could, in the words of High Commissioner Sir Laurence Guillemard, be equipped "to take their proper place in the administrative and commercial life of these States." In reality, the non-elite Malays felt marginalised by the economic and political policies of the colonial government, and felt increasingly separated and disconnected from the Malay elite.

The local-born non-Malay communities soon began a campaign for self-rule. In 1936, the Malayan-born Indian community asked High Commissioner Sir Shenton Thomas to grant them a share of administrative appointments. Thomas rejected the request, referring to the local-born Indians as "foreigners". Although the colonial government appeared to view the Chinese as a "transient labor force," with statistics indicating most Chinese migrants eventually returned home, some historians have contended that the local-born Chinese population was steadily growing during the period. Nevertheless, the colonial government insisted it would be dangerous to consider the Chinese as having "a tendency to permanent settlement"; the locally born Indian community — comprising 20% of the Indian population, the rest being manual labourers having migrated for similar reasons as the Chinese at around the same time — was likewise largely ignored.

The colonial government ensured that the Malays would continue to maintain their "traditional" peasant lifestyle as much as possible, restricting movement, economic enterprises and education. This policy was maintained in the belief that education of Bengalis in India had led to discontent and rebellion. They involved only the Malay ruling class in government and administrative issues. Despite the exclusion of non-Malays from positions of authority, much of the civil service rank and file comprised non-Malays, many of them Indians who were specifically brought in for this purpose. A number of historians have described the pro-Malay policies as designed merely to preserve the position of the colonial authorities, rather than to strengthen that of the Malays; some have characterised the approach as keeping "the races at just the right distance from each other to have the disparate elements of Malaya work in remote harmony".

In the 1920s, the local-born Chinese, who retained significant economic power, began pushing for a greater role in Malayan government. Much of the Chinese community, which now made up 45% of the Malayan population, still comprised transient laborers. Nevertheless, the Straits Chinese — which comprised the bulk of local-born Chinese — wanted to be given government positions and recognised as Malayans. One Straits Chinese leader asked, "Who said this is a Malay country? ... When Captain [Francis] Light arrived, did he find Malays, or Malay villages? Our forefathers came here and worked hard as coolies — weren't ashamed to become coolies — and they didn't send their money back to China. They married and spent their money here, and in this way the Government was able to open up the country from jungle to civilization. We've become inseparable from this country. It's ours, our country..." Malay intellectuals objected to this reasoning, claiming that such reasoning is totally absurd and proposing an analogy with the Chinese as masons and Malaya as a house. A paid mason, they argued, was not entitled to a share in the ownership rights to a home he built. As such, they opposed any attempt to grant the Chinese citizenship or other political rights.

A number of Indonesian ethnic groups such as the Javanese and Bugis had migrated within the Malay Archipelago throughout the nineteenth and twentieth centuries, and were most quickly assimilated into the Malay cultural identity. Eventually, the Chinese-Malayan appeals appeared to have some impact on the British. In 1927, the governor of the Straits Settlements referred to the Chinese as "indigenous inhabitants of British Malaya".

Just before the Second World War, Malay nationalism began emphasising ketuanan Melayu, which had once been taken for granted. It was feared that British policies now seemed geared towards creating a common Malayan nationality inclusive of the Chinese and Indians. Some Malays thus sought to preserve the status quo with the British as a bulwark against the non-Malays. Others began calling for an independent and sovereign Malay nation, such as "Greater Indonesia".

=== The Malayan Union (1946–48) ===
After the end of the Second World War, the British announced the establishment of the Malayan Union, which would loosen immigration policies, reduce the sovereignty of the Malay rulers, and abstain from recognising Malay supremacy, establishing Malaya as a protectorate of the United Kingdom. As local-born residents, most Chinese and Indians qualified for citizenship under the Union's principle of jus soli. With equal rights guaranteed to all, the Malays became dissatisfied with that. Even their traditional stronghold, the civil service, would be open to all Malayans. In the first place, the Malays did not consider themselves to be included under the label of "Malayans".

The Malays became politically conscious, protesting against the Union's formation. At one gathering, placards declared that "Malaya Belongs to the Malays. We do not want the other races to be given the rights and privileges of the Malays." One Malay organisation informed the British that the Union's citizenship provisions would lead to "the wiping from existence of the Malay race along with their land and Rulers". A group of Malay royalists and civil servants led by Dato' Onn Ja'afar formed the United Malays National Organisation (UMNO) to protest the Malayan Union's formation.

Although the Union was established as planned, the campaign continued; in 1948, the British replaced the Malayan Union with the Federation of Malaya. The Federation restored sovereignty to the Malay rulers, tightened immigration and citizenship restrictions, and gave the Malays special privileges. Nevertheless, the avowed goal of the British remained the same as in 1946: to introduce "a form of common citizenship open to all those, irrespective of race, who regarded Malaya as their real home and as the object of their loyalty."

Limited opposition to ketuanan Melayu and UMNO during this period came from a coalition between the All-Malaya Council of Joint Action (AMCJA) and the Pusat Tenaga Rakyat (PUTERA). Although one of PUTERA's constituent organisations had insisted on ketuanan Melayu as a "National Birthright" of the Malays, PUTERA joined the AMCJA in championing equal political rights for non-Malays. After the British refused to heed the PUTERA-AMCJA coalition, it pulled out of talks with the British, later launching a major hartal (general strike) to protest perceived defects in the new polity. After the Federation was formed over their objections, the coalition disbanded.

Prior to the Federation, non-Malays were generally uninvolved in Malayan politics and nationalism, both essentially Malay in nature; being more interested in the politics of their respective homelands, non-Malays never significantly backed the Malayan Union openly but their silence was a support to it. The AMCJA, though mostly non-Malay, did not represent a large section of the non-Malay communities in Malaya. The lack of interest in or loyalty to Malaya amongst the non-Malays seemed to justify ketuanan Melayu — Malay self-rule.

Some historians have argued the Union's failure made the Chinese aware of the need for political representation. The Malayan Chinese Association (MCA) — a communal political party campaigning for Chinese political rights — was formed soon after the Federation's formation. Others claim that the main driving force behind non-Malay involvement in Malayan politics, and their assertion of certain rights, was the increasing number of local-born non-Malays. The same report from the British Permanent Under-Secretary of State for the Colonies cited earlier stated that Malayan-born non-Malays "have never seen the land of their origin and they claim that their children and their children's children should have fair treatment." The inaugural President of the MCA was Tan Cheng Lock, a local-born Chinese who had led the AMCJA until its breaking up.

=== Towards independence ===
Its initial goals achieved, UMNO established itself as a political party to fight for independence. At the same time, the Malayan Communist Party (MCP) launched an armed insurgency to form a communist government in Malaya, culminating in the Malayan Emergency which lasted until after independence. The insurgency was marked by a clear racial divide; opposition to the insurrection was almost entirely Malay, while Chinese dominated the communist ranks. The British encouraged the establishment of the Communities Liaison Committee (CLC), comprising the top echelon of Malayan politicians from different communities, to address sensitive issues, especially those related to race. Compromises on a number of issues, including citizenship, education, democracy, and Malay supremacy, were agreed on. Eventually, a "bargain" between the Malays and non-Malays was formulated; in return for giving up ketuanan Melayu, the Malays would be assisted in closing the economic gap between the Malay and non-Malay communities. CLC member E.E.C. Thuraisingham later said, "I and others believed that the backward Malays should be given a better deal. Malays should be assisted to attain parity with non-Malays to forge a united Malayan Nation of equals."

Problems continued to crop up. Many Chinese Malayan youths drafted into the army to stave off communist attacks fled the country; most participants were English- and not Chinese-educated. To the Malays, this indicated that the Chinese had no particular loyalty towards Malaya and justified ketuanan Melayu, heightening similar perceptions caused by the apparent racial dichotomy between those in fierce opposition to the communists and those supporting the MCP.

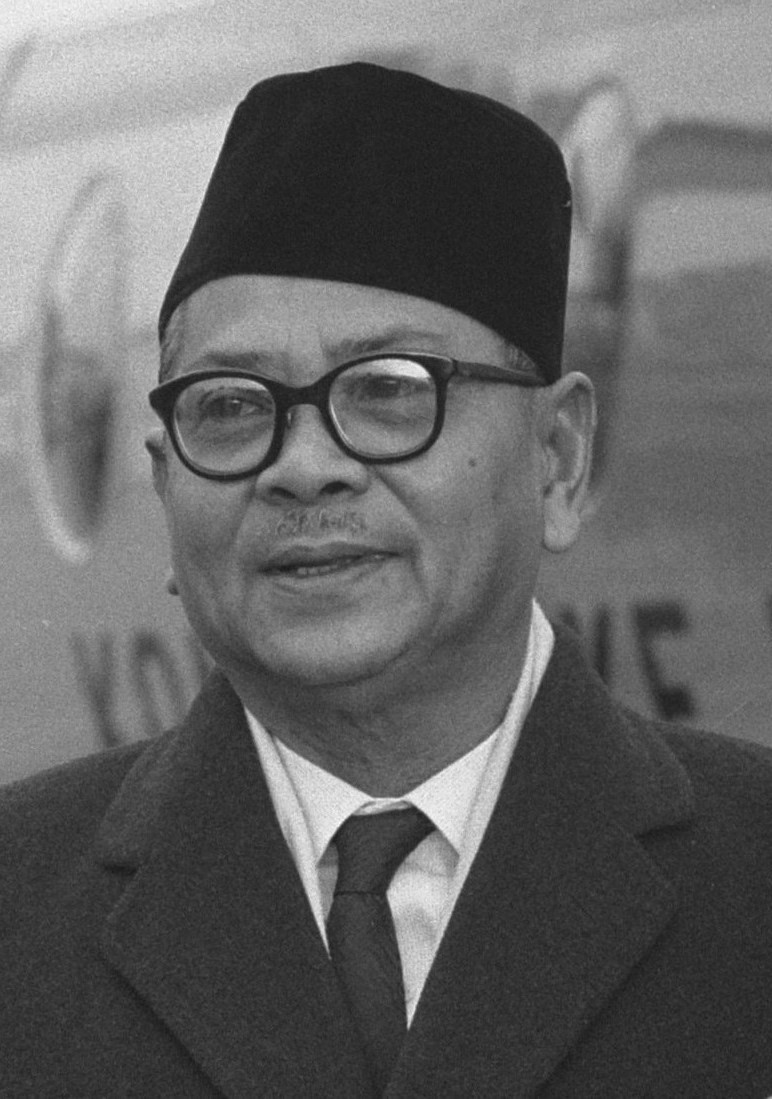
Tunku Abdul Rahman (the Tunku), father of the independence

In the early 1950s, Onn Ja'afar proposed to open UMNO membership to all Malayans, and renaming it the United Malayan National Organisation, which would have diluted its identity as a champion of ketuanan Melayu. Defeated in an internal power struggle, he resigned in 1951 to found the Independence of Malaya Party (IMP). He was succeeded by Tunku Abdul Rahman (often known as "the Tunku"), who insisted on initial Malay sovereignty. Expressing concern over a lack of loyalty to Malaya among non-Malays, he demanded they clarify their allegiance before being accorded citizenship, going on to state: "For those who love and feel they owe undivided loyalty to this country, we will welcome them as Malayans. They must truly be Malayans, and they will have the same rights and privileges as the Malays." Not long after, in 1952, however, he appeared to contradict himself, and insisted that Malays safeguard their special position: "Malaya is for the Malays and it should not be governed by a mixture of races."

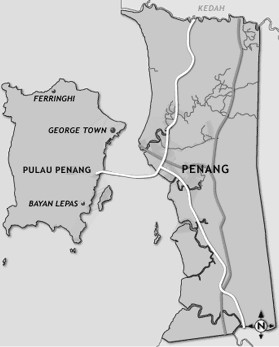
During the early 1950s, there was an active Penang secessionist movement agitating against Ketuanan Melayu.

During this period, some Straits Chinese began taking interest in local politics, especially in Penang, where there was an active Chinese secessionist movement. Identifying more with the British than the Malays, they were especially angered by references to them as pendatang asing (foreigners). Avoiding both UMNO and the MCA, they believed that while UMNO and Malay extremists were intent on extending Malay privileges and restricting Chinese rights, the MCA was too "selfish", and could not be relied on. Uncomfortable about the merger of the Straits Settlements with Malaya, they did not feel a sense of belonging in a "Malaya for the Malays" where they were not considered bumiputra ("sons of the soil"). One Straits Chinese leader indignantly declared, "I can claim to be more anak Pulau Pinang [a son of Penang] than 99 per cent of the Malays living here today." With the government's stout rejection of secession, the movement eventually petered out.

Some suggested that the non-Malays did not feel loyal to Malaya because they did not consider themselves to be of Malayan nationality and adhere strictly to their own ethnic cultural backgrounds. To counter this, in 1952 citizenship was granted to nearly all local-born non-Malays, and dual citizenship prohibited, forcing non-Malays to choose between their ancestral homeland and Malaya. In contrast to the Malay's hypothesis, a majority of the non-Malays remained, thus proving their allegiance to Malaya. They are the ancestor of modern-day non-Malay Malaysian.

As Malaya moved to self-government, the British initiated the Member System, modelled on the cabinet system; like the CLC, it drew on members of different communities, and was later described as setting a precedent for the power-sharing multiracial Malayan and Malaysian cabinets post-independence. At the same time, the British also began laying the framework for a national education system that would create "a sense of common citizenship". The Barnes Report that they commissioned, however, was strongly objected to by the Chinese community for being "saturated with Malay nationalism" and bolstering ketuanan Melayu. The Fenn-Wu Report, favoured by the Chinese, did not meet with Malay approval. In the end, the Barnes Report's recommendations for English-medium "national schools" were implemented by the 1952 Education Ordinance, over vocal Chinese protests, who were upset by the lack of provision for non-Malay vernacular schools. In 1956, a committee headed by Tun Abdul Razak re-evaluated the education system. The "Razak Report" recommended that vernacular primary schools be permitted to continue, but share a common syllabus with national schools. Vernacular secondary schools would not be sanctioned; only national secondary schools would be funded. The Chinese community strenuously objected to the Razak Report as well, launching an organised campaign against it; the MCA's refusal to oppose the Report cost it politically in some Chinese constituencies. Nevertheless, the Razak Report's recommendations were largely successful, and many of them remain in place as of 2006.

=== Possible origins of ketuanan Melayu ===
According to many historians, the root cause of ethnic strife and ketuanan Melayu was a lack of mixing between the Malays and non-Malays. An exception to this were the Straits Chinese, who managed to assimilate reasonably well, despite the assimilation taking 600 years including intermarriage. According to the Ming Shi-lu, the ancestors of the Straits Chinese were "gifts" given to the Sultan of Malacca as a recognition of both bilateral ties between the Ming Dynasty and the sultanate, and of Malay sovereignty. At the time, most were rich merchants during British rule instead of manual labourers and many habitually spoke Malay, dressed in the Malay style, and preferred Malay cuisine.

The British educational policies regards the different races in Malaysia — providing minimal public education for Malays, and leaving non-Malays to their own devices — did not help matters. The Malays, predominantly rural-dwellers, received no encouragement to socialise with the more urban non-Malays. The economic impoverishment of the Malays which set them apart from the better-off Chinese also fanned racial sentiments.

Another contributing factor to ketuanan Melayu was the World War II Japanese occupation. The war "awakened a keen political awareness among Malayan people by intensifying communalism and racial hatred". Japanese policies "politicised the Malay peasantry", intentionally fanning the flames of Malay nationalism. Two Malay historians wrote that "The Japanese hostile acts against the Chinese and their apparently more favourable treatments of the Malays helped to make the Chinese community feel its separate identity more acutely..." A foreign commentator agreed, stating that "During the occupation period ... Malay national sentiment had become a reality; it was strongly anti-Chinese, and its rallying cry [was] 'Malaya for the Malays'..."

=== The Alliance - 1955 Federal Legislative Council elections ===
Although UMNO supported ketuanan Melayu, it formed an "Alliance" with the MCA and the Malayan Indian Congress (MIC) to contest the 1955 Federal Legislative Council elections. This took many by surprise, as the MCA had strenuously insisted on equal political rights for all citizens. Its President, Tan Cheng Lock, was himself a Straits Chinese, albeit not as extremist as the secessionists. Although initially dismissed as a marriage of convenience, the Alliance won 51 out of 52 seats available. The sole remaining seat went to the Pan-Malayan Islamic Party (PMIP; later known as PAS), a Malay-based party and strong advocate of ketuanan Melayu. The total defeat of non-communal parties led the Alliance to perceive the political atmosphere as inhospitable for multi-racial parties. A coalition government comprising mono-racial parties in which party leaders privately brokered compromise decisions was thought more stable and better suited to Malayan politics.

Prior to the election, Dato' Onn Ja'afar had changed his approach, forming the Parti Negara after IMP suffered crushing losses to the Alliance in local elections. Advocating stronger pro-Malay policies recognising Malay political dominance, the Parti Negara failed to shake the Alliance's grip on power. However, some believe Parti Negara's proposals helped sway UMNO politicians towards more radically pro-Malay policies. The British themselves insisted on handing over power only to a multiracial government, and the Alliance was considered to meet this requirement.

== Independence and formation of Malaysia ==
=== Independence and the Constitution ===
The Federation of Malaya became officially independent from the British Empire in 1957. The new state's Constitution contained provisions, such as Article 153, guaranteeing the Malays certain privileges as a form of affirmative action. The Reid Commission, which drafted the Constitution, stated that Article 153 was to be temporary in nature, and should be reviewed by Parliament 15 years after independence. The Constitution itself did not explicitly state this, however, nor did it clarify the purpose of Article 153. It did declare all Malayans equal under the law, without mention of "Malay sovereignty" or any other ideas related to ketuanan Melayu. Jus soli citizenship — the granting of citizenship to anyone born in the Federation — was also granted, albeit without retrospective effect; it was a major concession by the Malays, who had vigorously campaigned against jus soli citizenship in the Malayan Union.

On the other hand, Malay and Islam became the national language and official religion, while the Malay rulers remained. This was taken to mean that the Malays were accorded deference as the definitive people of Malaya — i.e. being a Malayan would be the same as being a Malay — and in the eyes of many, gave Malaya a Malay identity. One academic suggested that "The Malays have a deep-rooted feeling that they alone are the bumiputras, the sons of the soil, and as such have certain special rights over the land." Indeed, the Tunku said in 1964 that "It is understood by all that this country by its very name, its traditions and character, is Malay. ... In any other country where aliens try to dominate economic and other fields, eventually there is bitter opposition from the indigenous people. But not with the Malays. Therefore, in return, they must appreciate the position of the Malays..." It has been suggested that a Malaysian nationality did not emerge because "all the national symbols in Malaysia were derived from the Malay tradition".

The Constitutional restraint on the size of rural Parliamentary constituencies was later removed, providing what one commentator called "an indirect buttress" to Malay special rights; as Malays were concentrated in rural areas, this indirectly enhanced Malay political power. The original Constitution had implicitly followed "one man, one vote". The change was denounced as "giving one man one vote, another a number of votes: not on the basis of, say, intellectual ability or geographical accident, but in order to ensure the dominance of a particular group."

The constitutional provisions, which have been referred to as the "Malay Agenda", evoked little sentiment from non-Malays, despite most of them gaining citizenship and thus becoming theoretically equal to Malay citizens under the Constitution. This could be attributed to acceptance of the social contract, of which one historian wrote: "At the elite level, non-Malays recognized that Malays were politically superior by virtue of their indigenous status and that the Malaysian polity would have a Malay character ... Malays were to be assured of safe majorities in both the state and federal parliament ... Malays would control the highest positions of the government and ... dominate members of the federal cabinet." A Malay historian wrote that "In return the Chinese gained more than overseas Chinese in Southeast Asia had dreamed of — equal citizenship, political participation and office holding, unimpaired economic opportunity, and tolerance for their language, religion, and cultural institutions."

Some expressed trepidation at Article 153; shortly before independence, the China Press suggested that while special rights "may be excusable at the start of the building of a nation," if "the period of 'special rights' is not restricted, or the scope of special rights is not clearly defined, then endless disputes ... will arise later on," and argued that special rights would eventually divide instead of unite Malayans. Nevertheless, at the time of independence, some historians assert, "there was a genuine sense of common citizenship, common aspirations, a common destiny." This was about to change.

=== Merger ===
In 1961, when the Malayan government began discussing a possible merger with neighbouring Singapore, Sabah, Sarawak and Brunei, problems of ethnic power relations arose again. The "Malaysia" proposal without Sabah and Sarawak went back more than a decade; earlier negotiations had proved fruitless. The Singaporeans themselves were not anxious to be ruled by what they considered a Malay government. By 1961, however, Singapore had grown receptive to the idea of joining Malaysia, largely because of the prevailing idea at the time that industrial Singapore could not survive without access to Malayan markets.

The Malayan government was not keen on having the Chinese Singaporean population push the Malays into a minority position in the new Malaysia. Many Malays felt that upsetting the Malay-dominated nature of the armed forces and police might place them in a dangerous situation. It was also argued that the inferior economic position of the Malays would be emphasised by the entry of even more rich Chinese, setting the stage for major discontent. The Malayans decided to resolve this by merging with Sabah and Sarawak; both of these colonies had large native populations whom the colonial authorities considered "Malay". Under Article 160 of the Constitution, most of them were not Malay; the natives were mainly animists or Christians instead of Muslims as required. To resolve this issue, the government expanded its informal definition of "Malay" to include these people.

Sabahans and Sarawakians could not see how they would benefit from merger. Many regarded Malaya as being only for the Malays, a group they did not include themselves in. The spectre of "Malaysia" — the inclusion of the phrase "Malay" being considered frightening — with its official religion of Islam and official language of Malay, did nothing to soothe their fears of "Malay domination". For merger to come about, they insisted the natives of Sabah and Sarawak be awarded the same privileges as Malays. A 20-point agreement between Sabah and the Malayan government, and a slightly different 18-point agreement by Sarawak, was later agreed upon. After much negotiation and a show of support from the British for a merger, the impasse was resolved. Although natives of Borneo were denied the privileges of Malays, merger was effected on 16 September 1963.

=== "Malaysian Malaysia!" ===
In the 1963 Singapore state elections, the Alliance challenged the governing People's Action Party (PAP) through the Singapore Alliance Party. UMNO politicians actively campaigned in Singapore for the Singapore Alliance, contending that Singaporean Malays were being treated as second-class citizens under the Chinese-dominated, though ostensibly multiracial, PAP government. However, all of the UMNO-backed Malay candidates lost to the PAP. The PAP politicians, who saw this as a betrayal of an earlier agreement with the Alliance not to contest elections in Malaya and Singapore (respectively), decided to run on the mainland in the 1964 general election. Although the PAP attracted large crowds at its rallies, it won only one seat — that by Devan Nair, who represented the Bangsar constituency. It is thought by some historians that Finance Minister and MCA President Tan Siew Sin's appeal to the Chinese to avoid challenging the Malay special rights and risk merger with Indonesia helped the MCA retain its status as the "undisputed leader of the Chinese in the Malayan peninsula". Nevertheless, UMNO leaders were furious with the PAP.

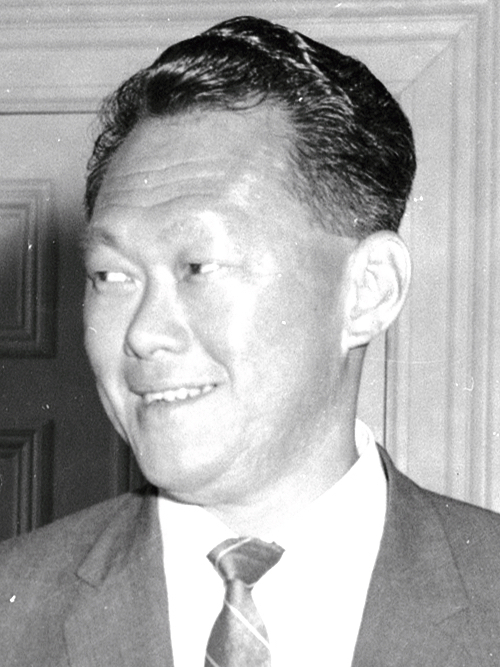
Lee Kuan Yew, the leader of the Singapore government, publicly opposed ketuanan Melayu, and propagated his idea of a "Malaysian Malaysia".

New problems soon cropped up. Lee Kuan Yew, the leader of the Singaporean government and the PAP, declared his open opposition to ketuanan Melayu, calling for a "Malaysian Malaysia" instead of the implied Malay Malaysia. He argued that "Malays began to migrate to Malaysia in noticeable numbers only about 700 years ago. Of the 39% Malays in Malaysia today, about one-third are comparatively new immigrants like (Syed Jaafar Albar), who came to Malaya from Indonesia just before the war at the age of more than thirty. Therefore, it is wrong and illogical for a particular racial group to think that they are more justified to be called Malaysians and that the others can become Malaysian only through their favour."

Lee later lamented: "Malaysia — to whom does it belong? To Malaysians. But who are Malaysians? I hope I am, Mr Speaker, Sir. But sometimes, sitting in this chamber, I doubt whether I am allowed to be a Malaysian. This is the doubt that hangs over many minds, and ... [once] emotions are set in motion, and men pitted against men along these unspoken lines, you will have the kind of warfare that will split the nation from top to bottom and undo Malaysia." At times, however, Lee worsened things by making racial comments of his own. Many of his speeches harped on the ethnic composition of Malaysia, reminding listeners that the non-Malays were now in the majority, with 61% of the population to the Malays' 39% asking at one point, "Why should we go back to old Singapore and once again reduce the non-Malays in Malaya to a minority?" Lee exacerbated deteriorating PAP–UMNO relations by constantly demanding that the federal government "smack down their 'ultras'", whose ranks included prominent UMNO leaders such as Syed Jaafar Albar and Syed Nasir Ismail.

Lee's statements upset many, especially Alliance politicians. Tan Siew Sin called him the "greatest, disruptive force in the entire history of Malaysia and Malaya." The Tunku considered Lee too extremist in his views, while other UMNO politicians thought Lee was simply pandering to Malaysian Chinese with his rhetoric. Lee's statement about allegedly recent Malay migration met with stinging rebuttals; Albar declared: "To say that the Malays are in the same category as other races is an insult..." The UMNO newspaper Malaya Merdeka warned: "If the Malays are hard-pressed and their interests are not protected," they would merge Malaysia with Indonesia. It was this that the Tunku feared the most. To him, the ultras were not the real extremists — it was those who sought a "Greater Indonesia" to "fix" the Chinese that were the real threat.

The strain in race relations led to the Singaporean 1964 Race Riots, which PAP Malay politician Othman Wok later insinuated were planned beforehand by the ultras. In the year following the riots, tension continued growing. Syed Jaafar Albar declared that "Wherever I am, I am a Malay", drawing harsh return fire from Lee, who stated in Parliament: "If I had been going round and saying what [he] has been saying — wherever I am, I am a Chinese — where would we be? But I keep on reminding the people that I am a Malaysian. I am learning Bahasa Kebangsaan [Malay, the national language] and I accept Article 153 of the Constitution."

Lee insisted that he was not opposed to Malay special rights or Article 153, saying: "if the immigrant communities ... do not see the problems, if they can't feel what it is like to be a poor Malay, and don't feel for him, then I can say very soon he will manifest his disaffection in a very decisive way and the whole country will be thrown into turmoil." Few from the Alliance took this claim seriously. UMNO politicians insisted that a "Malaysian Malaysia" implied total equality, entailing the removal of Malay privileges. Senu Abdul Rahman, a federal Minister, felt Lee's advocacy of equality would deny the Malays the possibility of economic participation: "What we want is opportunity, the opportunity to obtain economic wealth for our people." Condemning Lee for stating he was a Malaysian by his own right, Senu asked: "The right which Lee is enjoying today did not fall from the sky or out of the blue. It was given to him. Doesn't he have some feeling of gratitude to the natives of this country?" Lee answered: "No, I am not enjoying anyone's hospitality. I am here as of right. And 61 per cent of the people of Malaysia have to stand by that or it is lost. Without it they would have no future." Some, such as Syed Jaafar Albar, took Senu's stance further and referred to the Malays, as the Bumiputra, as "masters of the house", whose hospitality was being abused by the bangsa asing (aliens) or orang tumpangan (lodgers) such as Lee. This provoked a response from Cabinet member Lim Swee Aun insisting "we are co-owners, not lodgers, not guests."

Some went against the common view held in UMNO. Ismail Abdul Rahman told Parliament that "...both the Alliance and the PAP subscribe to the concept of a Malaysian Malaysia," but differed in their methods. Ismail characterised the PAP's approach as "non-communalism straightaway," while the Alliance required "two steps. First, inter-racial harmony; second, and ultimate state of non-communalism." Such statements were dismissed by Lee as lip service that could not be taken seriously unless the ultras were reined in.

=== Separation ===
Lee continued his campaign, forming the Malaysian Solidarity Council (MSC) comprising multi-racial parties such as the PAP, the People's Progressive Party (PPP) and the United Democratic Party (UDP) in 1965. At the MSC's first and only general meeting, several leaders from these parties gave speeches supporting a Malaysian Malaysia. D.R. Seenivasagam of the PPP accused the Alliance of using Article 153 to "bully non-Malays", while Ong Kee Hui of the Sarawak United Peoples' Party (SUPP) said that "We see an attitude of intolerance and mounting signs of denial of political equality to people who are non-Malays. For the sake of our country and ourselves, this must be stopped and the drift to narrow racialism checked. Political equality should be accorded to all who live here and make this country their home, irrespective of their racial origin."

Soon after, UMNO backbencher Mahathir bin Mohamad attacked Lee in Parliament: "[The Singaporean Chinese] have never known Malay rule and cannot bear the idea that the people they have so long kept under their heels should now be in a position to rule them." Lee responded with an unscripted speech made entirely in Malay opposing the government's pro-Malay policies: "Of course there are Chinese millionaires in big cars and big houses. Is it the answer to make a few Malay millionaires with big cars and big houses? ... If we delude people into believing that they are poor because there are no Malay rights or because opposition members oppose Malay rights, where are we going to end up? You let people in the villages believe that they are poor because we don't speak Malay, because the government does not write in Malay, so he expects a miracle to take place [when Malay becomes the sole national language]. The moment we all start speaking Malay, he is going to have an uplift in the standard of living, and if doesn't happen, what happens then? Meanwhile, whenever there is a failure of economic, social and educational policies, you come back and say, oh, these wicked Chinese, Indian and others opposing Malay rights. They don't oppose Malay rights. They, the Malay, have the right as Malaysian citizens to go up to the level of training and education that the more competitive societies, the non-Malay society, has produced. That is what must be done, isn't it? Not to feed them with this obscurantist doctrine that all they have got to do is to get Malay rights for the few special Malays and their problem has been resolved."

Eventually, the Tunku — fed up with all the politicking and convinced that any further clashes of rhetoric would only degenerate into violence — asked Singapore to secede. Singapore became an independent nation in 1965, with Lee as its first Prime Minister. Although Article 152 of the Constitution of Singapore names the Malays as "indigenous people" of Singapore and mandates special safeguarding of their rights and privileges, the article does not specify any policies for such safeguarding.

Some later blamed the formation of Malaysia for strengthening ketuanan Melayu: "A reinforcement of Malay rights — which during the previous five or six years [prior to the formation of Malaysia] had been withering away as the Reid Commission might have suspected they would — took place against a background of general unequal treatment" after Malaysia's formation.

== 13 May and the New Economic Policy ==
=== Issues of language ===
The Constitution specified a ten-year delay after independence in changing the national language from English to Malay. As the scheduled date in 1967 drew near some extremists Chinese began to agitate for a more liberal language policy permitting some instances of Mandarin in public affairs. Conservatives from UMNO and PAS lashed out against them, but the Alliance proposed a compromise in the National Language Bill establishing Malay as the official language, but permitting English under certain circumstances and the use of non-Malay languages for non-official purposes. The Tunku described it as "a course guaranteeing peace", but the Bill was widely derided by many Malays, who formed the National Language Action Front in hope of repealing or amending it. The leadership of the Tunku was also openly questioned.

=== 13 May ===
In 1969, a general election was held. It was the first to be contested on a major scale by non-Malay-based opposition parties, other than the 1964 election where the PAP challenged the Alliance in Peninsular Malaysia. The two main opposition parties on this front in 1969 were the Democratic Action Party (DAP) — the Malaysian successor to the PAP, widely seen as Chinese-based — and the Parti Gerakan Rakyat Malaysia (Gerakan), an ostensibly multiracial party led by former MCA stalwart, Lim Chong Eu, and other middle-class intellectuals like Tan Chee Khoon and Syed Hussein Alatas. Both proposed policies on language, education, and Malay rights that were diametrically opposed to those of the government, with the DAP continuing where Lee Kuan Yew had left off with the "Malaysian Malaysia" campaign. Some, mostly from the DAP, called for the elevation of English, Mandarin and Tamil to official language status, along with Malay. Stronger government support for the Chinese education stream was also demanded.

PAS, on the other hand, attempted to garner votes by accusing UMNO of selling out the Malays' indigenous rights to "pendatang asing". When the results were released, PAS had made minor inroads, but the DAP and Gerakan managed to topple the Alliance from power in three states, and nearly eradicated the Alliance's traditional two-thirds majority in Parliament. A large part of these gains came at the expense of the MCA, which soon announced that it would not participate in the new government after the election, as the MCA no longer had a mandate to represent Chinese interests in the government. The jubilant DAP and Gerakan organised victory parades in the national capital of Kuala Lumpur on 11 and 12 May, where participants taunted the Malays while bearing slogans such as "Semua Melayu kasi habis" ("Finish off all the Malays"), "Ini negara Cina punya" (" This country is Chinese owned"). Nevertheless, the shocked Malays blamed Chinese voters for betraying "the Alliance formula by voting for an opposition that had revived fundamental questions of language and Malay special rights".

Malay conservatives welcomed the MCA's move, feeling an UMNO- and Malay-dominated government would better serve their purposes. UMNO held its own rally, which soon became a riot, on 13 May. This would later be euphemistically labelled as the "13 May Incident". UMNO supporters gathered at Harun's house on the evening of 13 May, where the rally was due to start, with many brandishing parangs (machetes) and other weapons after hearing the Chinese was insulting Malay and killed a few Malay passer-by and motorists and looted Malay stores and destroyed their homes. Some leaders condemned the "insults" of the "infidels" at the previous victory parades, calling the counter-rally a means "to protect Malay dignity" . Soon, the crowd began attacking Chinese who is also armed with bat and machetes and ready to charge. The rioting spread, and, despite the military being called in, continued for another two days.

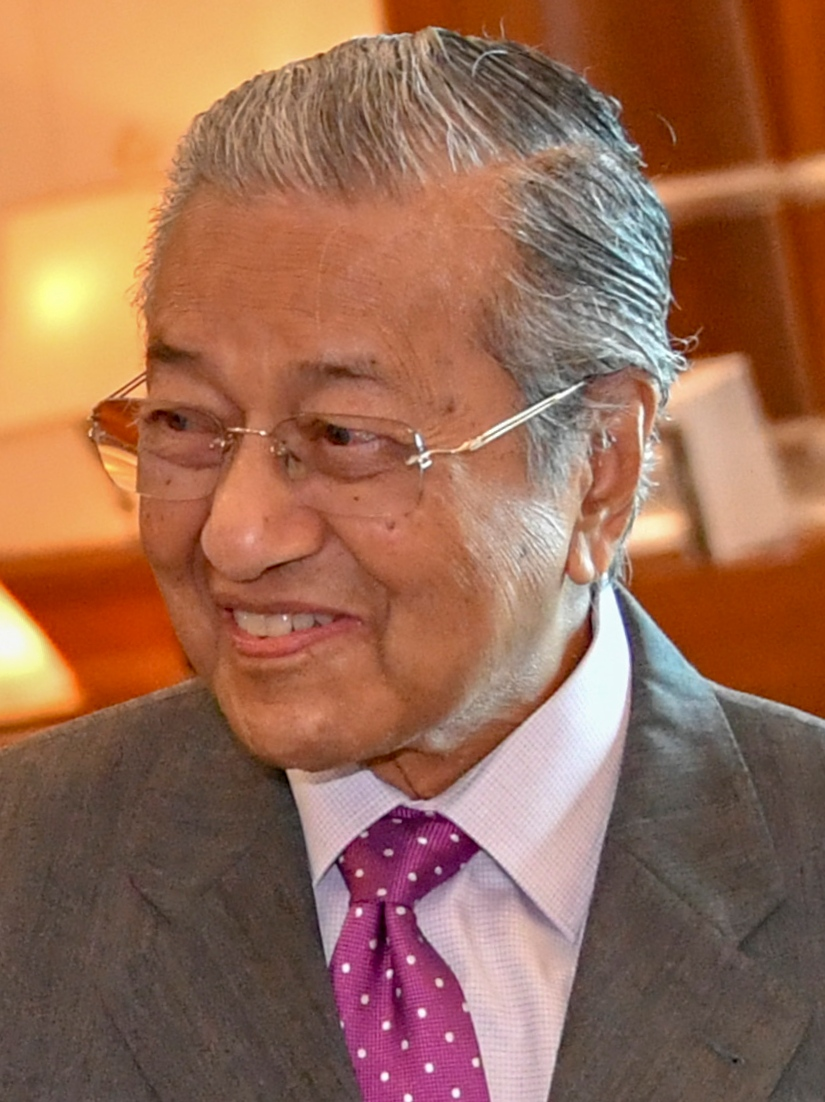
Mahathir Mohamad

As a result of the riots, Parliament was suspended, and a state of national emergency was declared. A National Operations Council (NOC) was formed to oversee the administration of the country under emergency rule. Although the rioting had died down, tensions continued to simmer. A non-Malay boycott of Malay goods and services received "near total" support, while many Malays, such as Mahathir Mohamad and Raja Muktaruddin Daim began calling for an autocracy led by UMNO alone, and the removal of the Tunku. According to some sources, one group of "ultras", comprising Syed Nasir Ismail, Musa Hitam, and Tengku Razaleigh, felt that the power-sharing Constitution had failed, and agreed that the country had to be "returned" to the Malays. They allegedly agreed to summon Mahathir to Kuala Lumpur, where he led his anti-Tunku campaign.

Mahathir wrote an open letter to the Tunku, accusing him of "giving the Chinese what they demand ... you have given them too much face." Soon, students at higher educational institutions across the country began to hold mass demonstrations, calling for the Tunku to step down in favour of a leader who would restore "Malay sovereignty". Sporadic rioting, believed to have been instigated by the Tunku's opponents, broke out.

Instead of bowing to their demands, the Tunku had Mahathir and Musa Hitam expelled from UMNO. The Minister of Home Affairs, Ismail Abdul Rahman, alleged that "These ultras believe in the wild and fantastic theory of absolute dominion by one race over the other communities, regardless of the Constitution. ... Polarisation has taken place in Malaysian politics and the extreme racialists among the ruling party are making a desperate bid to topple the present leadership."

=== The Malay Dilemma and New Economic Policy ===
Mahathir spent his political exile writing The Malay Dilemma, where he contended "that the Malays are the original or indigenous people of Malaya and the only people who can claim Malaya as their one and only country. In accordance with practice all over the world, this confers on the Malays certain inalienable rights over the forms and obligations of citizenship which can be imposed on citizens of non-indigenous origin." (Referring to the social contract.)

Mahathir expressed discomfort with "far too many non-Malay citizens who can swamp the Malays" when "...suddenly it has dawned upon the Malay that he cannot even call Malaya his land. There is no more Tanah Melayu — land of the Malays. He is now a different person, a Malaysian, but a Malay Malaysian whose authority in Malaya — his land — is now not only shared with others, but shared unequally. And as if this is not enough, he is being asked to give up more and more of his share of influence." Mahathir's defence of Malay rights focused both on the "definitive people" line of reasoning and the argument in favour of affirmative action, which the Reid Commission had chosen: "It is not... for reasons of Malay superiority that preferential treatment for Malays in scholarship awards was insisted upon. ... They are a means of breaking down the superior position of the non-Malays in the field of education. The Malays are not proud of this treatment." Shortly after becoming prime minister, Mahathir denied he had altered any of his views since he wrote the book.

Under the NEP, Bumiputra real estate purchases were subsidised.

Mahathir and Musa Hitam later rejoined UMNO and the government under Tun Abdul Razak, the second Prime Minister, whose New Economic Policy (NEP), was based on some of the reforms Mahathir's book had advocated. The NEP's stated goal was elimination of "the identification of race with economic function". To achieve this, it targeted a 30% share of the economy for the "Bumiputra" — "sons of the soil," a term referring to Malays and other indigenous peoples — by 1990. This became known as the "30 per cent solution" setting the "Bumiputra quota" for many items, including new public share listings and new private housing schemes. Certain commentators alleged that this fostered "a close to 'zero-sum' attitude chiefly between the Malays and Chinese". The NEP's stated aim, however, was not to directly redistribute wealth but to enlarge the economic pie while providing a larger share of the gains for Malays, thus increasing participation in the economy for all.

The main rationale for the NEP as set out in the Second Malaysia Plan was to address the "economic imbalance" between the Chinese and Malays. In 1969, the Malay share of equity reportedly stood at 1.5% while the Chinese held 22.8%; the rest was largely in foreign hands. Some detractors argued that while the Chinese share of the economy had increased at the Malays' expense, more significant growth in inequality had occurred between the richest and poorest Malays — between 1957 and 1970, the wealthiest 20% of Malays' share in the Malay portion of the economy reportedly increased from 42.5% to 52.5% while the poorest 40% saw a decrease from 19.5% to 12.7%.

The NOC issued a report of its own analysing the root causes of the 13 May violence, suggesting that even in the civil service, a traditional Malay employer, non-Malays outnumbered the Malays in many areas, with substantial Malay majorities only in the Police and Armed Forces. The report concluded: "Allegations that the non-Malays are excluded are regarded by the Malays as deliberate distortion. The Malays who already felt excluded in the country's economic life, now began to feel a threat to their place in the public services. No mention was ever made by non-Malay politicians of the almost closed-door attitude to the Malays by non-Malays in large sections of the private sector in this country."

According to the Second Malaysia Plan, the NEP aimed to "create a Malay commercial and industrial community" through "wholly owned enterprises and joint ventures". Prior to this, the government had, in the words of a local economist, played "administrative, supportive, and regulatory" roles in attempting to address the economic imbalance, but avoided "represent[ing] direct and active efforts in promoting" Malay interests. Now, the government would not only "[limit] access of the Chinese and Indian population to universities, public jobs and public money," but also actively intervene in the economy to give "[the Bumiputra] a bigger piece of the business action". One criticism of this increased intervention was that UMNO supposedly "became a major beneficiary of the expanded role of the state".

There had been limited affirmative action programmes before. However, these mostly focused on the civil service, as Article 153 of the Constitution did. Admission to higher education was largely merit-based. The Tunku government preferred laissez-faire policies, minimising economic intervention. Although some agencies, such as the Rural Industrial Development Agency (RIDA), which attempted to aid Malay entrepreneurs, existed, their programs were criticised as being based on handouts and favouring the politically connected. RIDA was renamed as the Majlis Amanah Rakyat (The Indigenous People's Trust Council) or MARA in 1965, and came to symbolise the development of Malay entrepreneurship.

Although the NEP was aimed at addressing economic imbalances, it soon became associated with ketuanan Melayu. While the two were rarely directly equated, they were often mentioned together, with the implication that the NEP was derived from ketuanan Melayu. The NEP's greater intervention in the economy led some to "equate UMNO's monolithic image as the undisputed champion of Malay supremacy with the party's ability to shore up lucrative business deals."

=== Constitutional amendments and other policy changes ===
Parliament passed several amendments to the Constitution soon after the 13 May Incident, limiting free speech and "entrenching" certain articles related to Bumiputra special rights.

Parliament finally reconvened in 1971. Although the NEP was passed without its approval, Parliament's consent was required to amend the Constitution. The government-tabled Constitution (Amendment) Act 1971, in conjunction with some amendments to the Sedition Act, limited freedom of speech on "sensitive issues" such as the national language, Malay special rights, the Malay rulers, and the provisions for citizenship. These restrictions also applied to Members of Parliament, over-ruling their previous Parliamentary immunity. The amendments also clarified Article 152's meaning, and included the "natives of any of the States of Sabah and Sarawak" under Article 153, extending the formerly Malay-only rights to all Bumiputra. In addition, the Yang di-Pertuan Agong (King) could now direct any university or college to implement a proportion-based quota system favouring the Bumiputra. All higher educational institutions immediately enacted quota systems on the orders of the Education Ministry; some later questioned the move's constitutionality on the grounds that the King himself had not issued any directive.

To cap all this, the amendment of articles touching on the "sensitive issues" mentioned, as well as the clause governing this rule on amendments, was forbidden without the consent of the Conference of Rulers. Effectively entrenching the "sensitive" Articles, this was heavily criticised by opposition MPs. It was claimed that if Parliament could be prevented from discussing particular issue, Parliamentary sovereignty was undermined. It was also unclear if the ban from speaking on "sensitive issues" applied to the ban itself. Nevertheless, the provisions were passed. The Internal Security Act (ISA), which effectively allows the government to detain anyone it deems a threat to national security for an indefinite period without judicial review, was also amended in 1971 to stress the "preservation of intercommunal harmony".

Many of these changes saw fierce opposition in Parliament and abroad. When the proposed changes were first announced, the British press charged they would "preserve as immutable the feudal system dominating Malay society" by "giving this archaic body of petty constitutional monarchs incredible blocking power". The censorship of sensitive issues was labelled as paradoxical when contrasted with Tun Abdul Razak's speaking of "the full realization that important matters must no longer be swept under the carpet..." Other critics argued that Article 153 was nothing more than a "paper rice bowl", and in any case, did not even include the orang asli (native people) or aborigines within the scope of its privileges, rendering its rationale somewhat suspect.

Another important policy change came in the field of education. In 1970, the government made Malay the medium of instruction for primary, secondary, and tertiary education, replacing English. Although government funding for the Chinese and Tamil education streams continued, many non-Malays considered this new policy to be "the most discriminatory" thus far. The government's rationale was that this would provide better educational opportunities for the Malays, especially those who formerly had to make the transition from Malay-medium primary and secondary schools to English-medium universities. It was also argued that uniting students under one language would provide for greater racial harmony, while indirectly underscoring the "Malay nature of the state".

The same year that the medium of instruction was changed to Malay, the National Culture Policy (NCP) was announced. Syed Nasir Ismail described the government's policies as aimed at creating a "Bumiputra Muslim identity" (identiti Islam Kebumiputraan) for Malaysians. In essence, the NCP's goal was to eventually assimilate the non-indigenous peoples into an indigenous Malaysian identity. Despite stiff opposition from Chinese pressure groups, the government refused to withdraw the NCP. To foster national unity, the Rukunegara, or national ideology, was also introduced. Although the Rukunegara itself contains no references to ketuanan Melayu or the social contract, a government commentary mentioned the "position of Malays and other Natives, the legitimate interests of the other communities, and the conferment of citizenship" as key aspects of the Constitution while insisting: "No citizen should question the loyalty of another citizen on the ground that he belongs to a particular community." One political pundit described it as a formal declaration of the social contract or "Racial Bargain".

=== Politics and "Malay dominance" ===
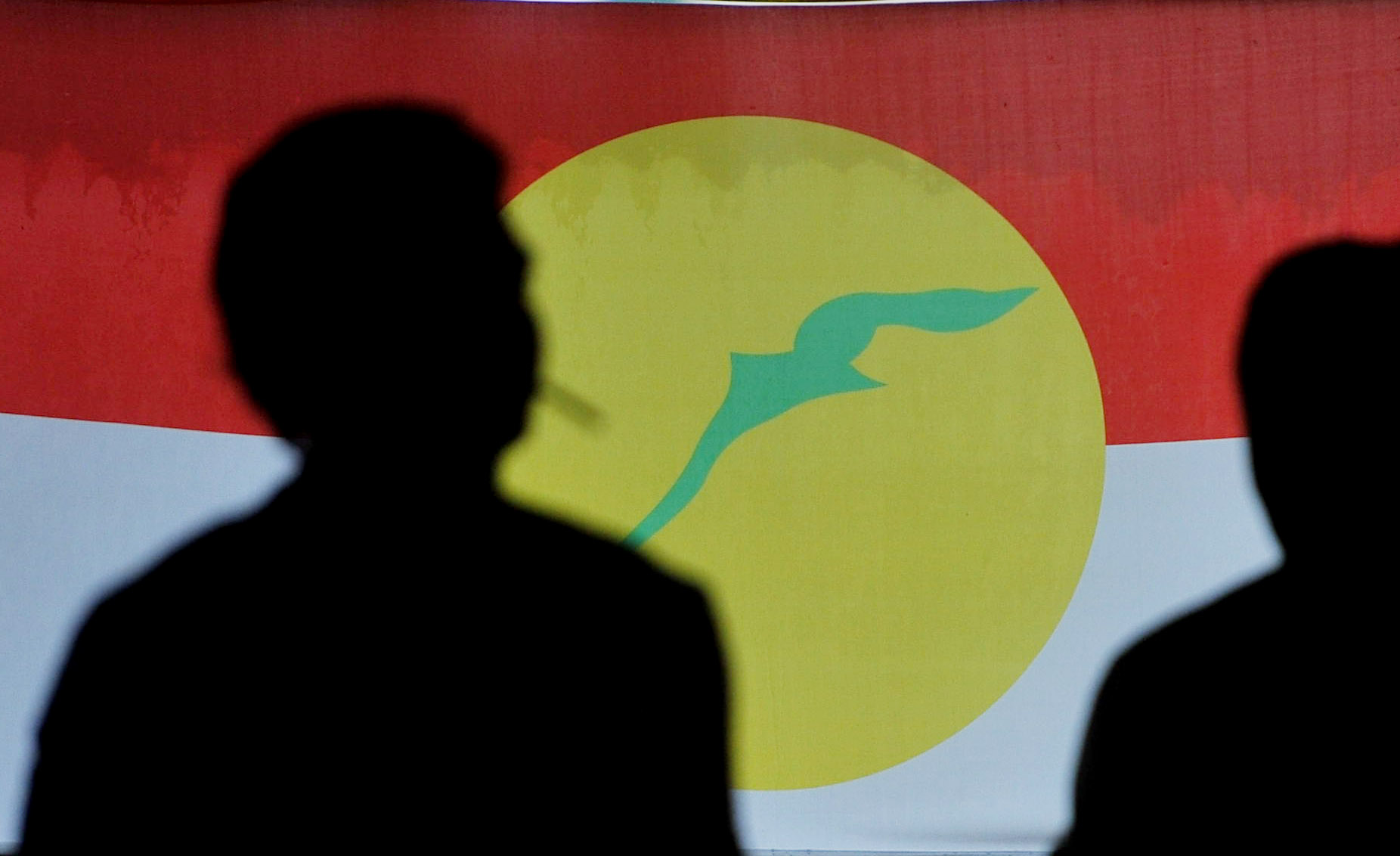
UMNO has historically been the political party that has fought for the concept since before independence.

The old Alliance model, where each race was represented by one party, was repudiated with the formation of the Barisan Nasional (BN, or the National Front) in 1974. Several former opposition parties, including Gerakan, the PPP and PAS, joined the UMNO-led BN. Although the MCA and MIC were included, their influence was diluted by other non-Malay parties in the coalition. In 1977, PAS' expulsion left UMNO as the sole Malay representative in BN, although some ostensibly multiracial parties provided token Malay representation. After its departure, PAS took a different approach to Malay privileges, denouncing the NEP as racial discrimination and "unIslamic".

In 1974, Mahathir was appointed as a Minister in Tun Razak's Cabinet. He became the Deputy Prime Minister just two years later.

During the 1970s — the heyday of the NEP — "Malay dominance" was a largely accepted fact of life for Malaysians. Whereas the 1957 to 1969 period was viewed as a time when "Malay dominance" was at least tempered by a form of "inter-ethnic bargaining" within the Alliance government, from the 13 May Incident onwards, political pundits argued that the political environment was now under marked "hegemonic control" from the Malays and UMNO; in 1970, one Cabinet member pronounced that Malay special rights would remain for "hundreds of years to come". The Tunku observed in 1977 that "it appears in the minds of the non-bumiputras that they are being turned into second-class citizens in the country." The government's ethnic policies continued to be based on and justified by the two basic arguments Mahathir had applied in his Dilemma; the "historical" status of Malay primacy over Malaya, and the "special needs" of the Malays. As public discussion or questioning of these issues had been criminalised, there were few locally published works critically discussing Malay supremacy, complicating attempts to evaluate it or establish further grounds for government policy beyond the main two traditionally put forth.

The ultras who had allegedly plotted to exploit the post-13 May chaos were now in control of the country. Razaleigh, the finance minister, was hailed as the "Father of the Bumiputra Economy". Musa Hitam and Mahathir, both rising stars on the political scene, maintained their image as "ultras", although it is unclear if this was their intention. Journalist K. Das once claimed Musa had told him "that a young Malaysian politician has to play the race card to the hilt even if there was not a single chauvinistic bone in his body." After retiring, Musa said that "the national leaders tend to look for a scapegoat when faced with a desperate crisis situation" and use racial tactics to fill their "empty stomach".

UMNO Youth in particular maintained its "ultra" image from the 1960s. One of its vice-presidents said in response to discussion of opening different teams in UMNO based on political ideology that "The original cause of UMNO is to fight for the interests of the Malay race and this must continue. We do not want factions in UMNO." Mahathir took office in 1981, with Musa Hitam as his deputy.

== Mahathir's first premiership, Malay vs Chinese, new economic policies, and Bangsa Malaysia ==
=== Affirmative action and Chinese protests ===
The affirmative action policies of the NEP continued under Mahathir. Political pundits considered this administration, in its early period, to be a continuation of the "hegemonic control" of Malaysian politics by the Malays, and by UMNO in particular. During this time, Mahathir focused on consolidating his power within UMNO and the government. As a result, there was little active confrontation between the Malays and the non-Malays on the issue of ketuanan Melayu at the time.

In 1981, the MCA assessed the NEP and other government policies from a Chinese point of view. Its findings expressed concern over a number of problems, including alleged disrespect of the citizenship of the Malaysian Chinese and the Malay-dominated civil service, claiming the NEP's goal of eradicating identification of race with economic function had been abrogated. In addition, it was argued that non-Malays were under-represented in Parliament and the Cabinet because of gerrymandering; mostly Malay rural Parliamentary constituencies outnumbered heterogeneous urban constituencies, despite the total population of urban constituencies exceeding that of rural ones. However, UMNO avoided directly confronting the MCA over the issue.

Tensions rose after the 1986 general election when it appeared that UMNO on its own commanded a working Parliamentary majority, allowing it to govern without the support of other parties. Several UMNO leaders seriously discussed the possibility of governing alone; one, Abdullah Ahmad, publicly espoused permanent Malay supremacy and relegating non-Malays to second-class citizenship. Such calls for unilateralism were eventually disregarded, and the Barisan Nasional government continued. However, some UMNO officials warned non-Malay parties to avoid "playing with fire" by questioning the Malays' special rights and privileges or Hak Keistimewaan Orang Melayu. At the UMNO General Assembly that year, Mahathir stated: "We do not wish to rob other people of their rights. But let no one try to rob us of our rights." When Parliament reconvened, the DAP began raising objections to what they alleged was the division of Malaysians into "first and second class citizens". In response, some UMNO MPs began referring to the non-Malays as pendatang asing (foreign immigrants, or aliens) in Parliament. When the DAP attempted to enquire about the distribution of economic equity among the races to evaluate the NEP's progress, the Standing Orders of Parliament were amended to forbid such inquiries. This led the DAP to allege that the NEP's aims had been met, and that it could be allowed to expire in 1990.

Some, such as Petaling Jaya city councillor Richard Yeoh, believe that Abdullah Ahmad, an aide of Mahathir's, was the first to use the term "ketuanan Melayu". Yeoh described the context in which Ahmad used it as "a fairly benign speech and most of us might have had no problem with it, but it has been taken to mean Malay supremacy by some Umno leaders who don't necessarily know what it means."

Ethnic tension continued to grow shortly after Mahathir narrowly defeated Tengku Razaleigh Hamzah for the UMNO Presidency in 1987. Around this time, several deposit-taking co-operatives (DTCs), some associated with the MCA, collapsed. To save Chinese investors, the MCA asked the government to bail out the DTCs, citing a previous bailout of Bumiputra financial institutions. UMNO's reluctance to acquiesce led MCA Deputy President Lee Kim Sai to warn that the MCA might quit the government. Later that year, the government posted several non-Chinese-educated staff to senior positions in Chinese vernacular schools. Anwar Ibrahim, then Education Minister, refused to yield to protests from the MCA, and stated that the decision was final, despite a previous informal agreement on the issue between the Malay and Chinese communities.

The Gerakan, MCA and DAP held rallies and boycotted classes in Chinese primary schools to protest the move; UMNO Youth held its own rallies to assert ketuanan Melayu, hosting banners with slogans such as "revoke the citizenship of those who opposed the Malay rulers", "13 May has begun", and "soak it [the keris, a Malay dagger] with Chinese blood". Future Prime Minister and then UMNO Youth Chief Najib Razak (the son of Tun Razak) threatened to bathe a keris with Chinese blood. The flames were fanned further when in an unrelated incident, a Malay soldier ran amok in a predominantly Chinese area, killing one and injuring another two.

The government then launched Operation Lalang (Weeding Operation), detaining 55 people under the ISA. More were arrested over the next few months. Although most were opposition politicians — including Parliamentary Opposition Leader Lim Kit Siang — a few from BN were included. All BN politicians were released from detention after two months, while those from the opposition remained in custody for much longer. The government later justified these detentions on grounds of security, stating that the detainees had played up the issue of Chinese education to incite racial sentiment. Some of Mahathir's supporters saw this as a vindication of his rejection of the Tunku's "compromise" with the non-Malays, teaching the non-Malays not to criticise the government and its pro-Malay policies.

Many critics did not take this explanation seriously. UMNO was in crisis at the time, with Mahathir's faction narrowly defeating Razaleigh's in the party elections. Razaleigh's supporters filed a lawsuit alleging irregularities in the election process which appeared likely to succeed, triggering new party elections. In this context, one MCA politician charged that the government had pursued a "hidden agenda," deflecting public attention from UMNO's crisis with a "deviation in the implementation of the Chinese education policy." The Tunku himself claimed that Mahathir used the issue to mobilise the Malays "as a united force to a common enemy — and the imaginary enemy in this case was the Chinese community."

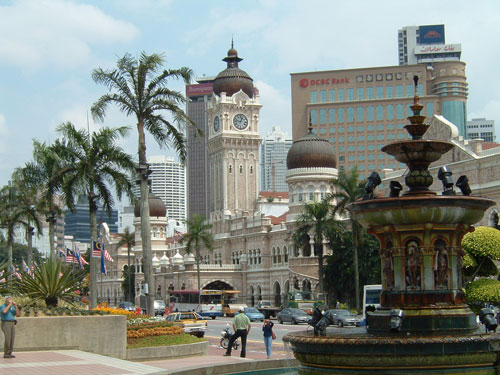
The Lord President of the Supreme Court, Salleh Abas, was sacked by Mahathir soon after he agreed to hear the appeal of Mahathir's opponents within UMNO.

In the end, Mahathir's camp "won" the court case when it was held that as the party was an illegal organisation under the Societies Act due to some of its branches not being formally registered, the plaintiffs' case was invalid; an illegal society could not hold new elections for its leaders. Mahathir immediately set up "UMNO (Baru)" (New UMNO), transferring all of old UMNO's assets to the new party. Most of his supporters also joined UMNO (Baru), and eventually the "(Baru)" was dropped, making it, for all intents and purposes, the same as the old UMNO. When the Supreme Court agreed to hear an appeal on the case, the government suspended and later sacked Lord President Salleh Abas and five other Supreme Court judges, triggering the 1988 Malaysian constitutional crisis. The new Supreme Court later dismissed the case.

Razaleigh then formed the Semangat 46 (Spirit of '46) party to challenge the government. In the 1990 general election, ketuanan Melayu was used as an issue, with UMNO accusing Semangat 46, PAS, the DAP and other opposition parties of conspiring to end Malay supremacy. The government also repeatedly warned that the 13 May riots would be repeated if it did not maintain its two-thirds majority in Parliament. Full-page advertisements depicting bloodshed and carnage were published in major national newspapers. Tensions rose further when the Tunku called on voters to support Semangat 46 instead of the new UMNO, with several UMNO politicians demanding that his title of "Bapa Kemerdekaan" (Father of Independence) be withdrawn, and his statue removed from Parliament House. Despite this, the government retained its two-thirds Parliamentary majority, with Semangat 46 winning only eight seats.

=== Reviewing and reworking economic policies ===
Prior to the expiration of the NEP in 1990, there was much debate over whether the policy should be renewed, replaced, or scrapped altogether. The government organised an official review of the NEP in the years leading up to its expiration. The NEP had been faced with a number of criticisms throughout its lifetime, most of them related to political corruption and other inefficiencies.

One point of dispute was the calculation of Malay equity. Although officially, as of 1992, the Malays controlled 18% of the economy, some dismissed this figure as misleading. It was argued that as in reality, much of this amount comprised equity held by government agencies, therefore it belonged to Malaysians as a whole. The practice of awarding public works contracts mainly to Bumiputras was argued to be stifling Malay competency by providing little incentive to improve. Many Bumiputra contractors in turn subcontracted their jobs to others, who were in some cases Chinese; "Ali Baba" arrangements with "the Malay [Ali] using his privileges to acquire licences and permits denied the non-Malay, then accepting a fee to be the front-man while the non-Malay [Baba] ran the business," were prevalent. Some suggested that the NEP "might have worked, if the Malay had actually wanted to learn the ropes. But more often than not, he just wanted to be rich."

Some said the disbursement of shares favoured the politically connected, many of whom immediately sold the shares at market price, reaping the arbitrage instead of holding on and increasing the Malay share of equity, which the policy was intended to do. Although the NEP managed to create a class of Malay millionaires, it was charged that this was mainly due to cronyism, benefiting only the politically connected. Some agreed, but argued against taking action; one PAS politician stated: "The Malays do not want justice to affect their interests." Other commentators have suggested that although most of the benefits under the NEP accrued to the politically connected, the government intended for them to "trickle down to the Malay masses", and also for the Malay nouveau riche to provide "entrepreneurial role models" for other Malays.

During the 1980s, concern continued to grow about discrimination in higher education. At this point, the Education Minister told Parliament of "dissatisfaction" and "disappointment" among non-Malays concerning "lessening opportunities" for higher education. Later in 1997, then Education Minister Najib Tun Razak defended the quotas as necessary, claiming that only 5% of all local undergraduates would be Malays if quotas were abolished.

Another criticism was that the NEP and other affirmative action had actually reduced the Malays' self-confidence, despite Mahathir's intention of building a Malay business class to serve as role models for impoverished Malays. One Malay journalist opined: "[U]nder this New Economic Policy, no Bumiputra could ever be sure that such 'victories' as came his way were fully deserved." The NEP was also criticised for seeking to improve the Malays' overall share of the economy, even if this share were to be held by a small number of Malays. Some quarters accused the NEP of being too heavy-handed in its approach towards affirmative action, maintaining it had "deprived qualified non-Malays of opportunities for higher education and job promotions" and forcing many non-Malays to emigrate instead. This, combined with the impressions of the NEP as corrupt and associated with ketuanan Melayu, led to "deep resentment", particularly among the Chinese. The NEP was criticised as "set[ting] those Malaysians so honoured with it above the rest, granting them the preferential treatment of the NEP," while "divid[ing] Malaysians into first- and second-class citizens".

In 1990, the NEP was replaced by the National Development Policy (NDP), which continued most of the NEP-era policies. The Malay share of the economy, though substantially larger, was not near the 30% target according to government figures. In its review of the NEP, the government found that although income inequality had been reduced, some important targets related to overall Malay corporate ownership had not been met. Both Mahathir and the Tunku had expressed concern that the Malays remained too reliant on the Chinese economically.

Claims that the NEP had retarded economic growth were dismissed; it was posited that the NEP had managed to avert further racial rioting, which would have hurt economic growth more than the NEP. The NEP was also defended as having created a Malay middle class and improving standards of living without compromising the non-Bumiputra share of the economy in absolute terms; statistics indicated that the Chinese and Indian middle classes also grew under the NEP, albeit not as much as the Malays'. The overall Malaysian poverty rate had shrunk from 50% at independence to 7%. It was also argued that ethnic stereotypes had been largely stamped out due to the NEP's success in creating a Malay upper class. Although many of the NEP's goals were restated by the NDP, the new policy appeared to be geared more towards wealth retention and creation, as opposed to simple redistribution. Nevertheless, many of the policies from the NEP era were retained under the NDP, which was set to expire in 2020.

=== Bangsa Malaysia and political liberalisation ===
During the 1990s, Mahathir and UMNO made a public about-face on the government's cultural policies, with the formation of the Wawasan 2020 (Vision 2020) and Bangsa Malaysia (Malaysian Race) plans. Mahathir named one obstacle to establishing Malaysia as a developed nation by the year 2020 as: "the challenge of establishing a matured, liberal and tolerant society in which Malaysians of all colours and creeds are free to practice and profess their customs, cultures and religious beliefs and yet feeling that they belong to one nation." Mahathir proposed the establishment of "one Bangsa Malaysia with political loyalty and dedication to the nation". After the government's 1995 general election victory, Mahathir elaborated: "Bangsa Malaysia means people who are able to identify themselves with the country, speak Bahasa Malaysia (the Malaysian or Malay language) and accept the Constitution."

Mahathir later explained that "The idea before was that people should become 100 per cent Malay in order to be Malaysian. We now accept that this is a multi-racial country. We should build bridges instead of trying to remove completely the barriers separating us." Such a dramatic change was perceived by the non-Malay communities as a "complete retraction" of earlier policies emphasising assimilation of non-Malays. The government took measures to stress this change, decreasing emphasis on Malay as the one and only national language by permitting local universities to use English as the medium of instruction for certain subjects. Diplomas from the MCA-sponsored and Chinese-majority Tunku Abdul Rahman College (TARC) were officially recognised by the government for employment in the civil service. For the first time, religions other than Islam were given airtime on state radio and television, although they were not allowed to proselytise. Lion dances — a traditional Chinese performance which had been banned for decades — were not only permitted but even attended by Mahathir and other top government officials.

Although the early 1990s saw marked economic growth, commentators suggested that Mahathir's liberal policies had played the key role in his popularity and the Barisan Nasional's landslide 1995 election victory. One pundit wrote that "Most Malaysians could not remember a time of greater prosperity or lesser inter-ethnic recrimination. ... Economic indicators alone would not have captured the pride that Malaysians had discovered, perhaps for [the] first time, in being Malaysian."

Lim Kit Siang attributed the opposition's defeat to Mahathir's liberalism and the government's adoption of the DAP's stance on issues like "language, culture and education". Some, however, doubted Mahathir's sincerity. One UMNO Youth official suggested that "The Barisan government's flexible move ... only shows that we are enjoying the highest level of tolerance purely based on the level of confidence in terms of political and economic position of the Malays. We share the political power with the Chinese. When they need to increase their political support from their community it is very important for them to serve the main concerns of the Chinese. So, why shouldn't we allow that? We can ... achieve a win-win situation. This is a purely political move. ... Similarly we UMNO Youth have to be often seen as a very racialist political group fighting for the Malay interests. ... However, those finished agendas that we have done, such as Islam, Bahasa Melayu [the Malay language] and the special status of the Malays, should not be questioned in any circumstance because these are very sensitive issues."

In the latter part of the 1990s, government policies were loosened to combat the Asian economic crisis by encouraging foreign investment. In 1999, a new opposition party supported by Mahathir's former deputy, Anwar Ibrahim (who had been jailed for sodomy after his controversial sacking) led to a revival of the "13 May" warnings. However, the government maintained its Parliamentary majority. In 2003, Mahathir officially resigned as prime minister, and was succeeded by his deputy, Abdullah Ahmad Badawi.

== Abdullah's administration, Ketuanan Melayu, and meritocracy ==
=== Reviewing Ketuanan Melayu ===
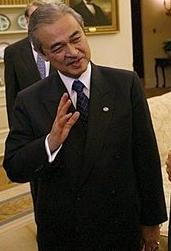
After Abdullah Ahmad Badawi succeeded Mahathir as the Prime Minister of Malaysia, Ketuanan Melayu was introduced into the national secondary school curriculum.

Prior to Abdullah's ascension in 2003, although ketuanan Melayu had been enunciated by several prominent Malay leaders, it had not been given a proper name. Around this time, the term "ketuanan Melayu" — "ketuanan" being roughly translated to "belongings" or "possessions" — came into common usage, even entering the government-approved secondary school curriculum.

A government-approved secondary school history textbook published in 2004 by Dewan Bahasa dan Pustaka, the government-owned publishing company, defined ketuanan Melayu as:

Semangat cinta akan apa saja yang berkaitan dengan bangsa Melayu seperti hak politik, bahasa, kebudayaan, warisan, adat istiadat dan tanah air. Semenanjung Tanah Melayu dianggap sebagai tanah pusaka orang Melayu.

Its English translation is as follows:

A spirit of love and passion for all things Malay, including political rights, language, culture, heritage, customs, and homeland. The Malay peninsula is regarded as their ancestral birthright.

In 2003, the United Malays National Organisation (UMNO) political party Youth Information Chief Azimi Daim stated: "In Malaysia, everybody knows that Malays are the owners of this land [Malay Peninsula] . We rule this country as provided for in the federal constitution. Any one who touches upon Malay affairs or criticizes Malays is [offending] our sensitivities."

Although its proponents claimed that ketuanan Melayu was directly derived from Article 153 of the Constitution, the Reid Commission which drafted the framework for the Constitution had stated that the provisions for Malay privileges were to be temporary in nature, and eventually abolished, citing the only reason for their existence as tradition and economic necessity as a form of affirmative action for the Malays. Despite this, those who challenge ketuanan Melayu or "Malay rights" were still often berated, especially by politicians from UMNO. Many UMNO politicians continued referring to non-Malays as "orang pendatang" or "pendatang asing" (foreign immigrants).

=== Meritocracy ===
Before leaving office, Mahathir had condemned Malays who relied on their privileges. Abdullah continued this, warning Malays to learn to live without crutches or end up in wheelchairs. His administration began the practice of meritocracy, which Mahathir had tentatively proposed, and university admissions quotas were eliminated. However, some charged that this did not eliminate discrimination in education. The pre-university stream was divided into two; one course prepared students for the Sijil Tinggi Persekolahan Malaysia (STPM) standardised examination, lasting two years, while the other comprised various matriculation courses graded by individual lecturers, typically lasting a year.

Critics dismissed meritocracy as a sham, arguing that it was unfair to consider the two streams equivalent for admissions purposes. Though ostensibly open to non-Bumiputra, critics alleged that most who took matriculation were Malays.

Previously, the constitutionality of Malay- or Bumiputra-only matriculation courses had been questioned, as the amended Article 153 prohibited refusal of admission to students on grounds of race alone. As a result, matriculation courses were opened to non-Bumiputra. However, some in UMNO considered meritocracy too harsh on rural Malay students, disadvantaging them compared to their urban counterparts, and called for the restoration of quotas to avoid an "uneven playing field".

At the 2004 UMNO General Assembly, Deputy Permanent Chairman Badruddin Amiruldin waved a book on 13 May Incident, warning: "Fifty-eight years ago we had an agreement with the other races, in which we permitted them to menumpang [reside temporarily] on this land. ... Let no one from the other races ever question the rights of Malays on this land. Don't question the religion, because this is my right on this land." Then Higher Education Minister Shafie Salleh also declared at the assembly that non-Bumiputras would never be permitted to enter the Universiti Teknologi MARA (UiTM), which is Bumiputra-only: "I will not compromise on this matter."

Then at the following year's General Assembly, Education Minister and UMNO Youth head Hishammuddin Hussein brandished the keris while calling for the restoration of the NEP as part of the National Development Policy (NDP) that Mahathir had initiated. According to Hishammuddin, the keris symbolised the role of UMNO Youth in championing the Malay race. Meanwhile, his deputy, Khairy Jamaluddin — Abdullah Badawi's son-in-law — discussed the revival of the NEP in the form of a separate entity titled as the New National Agenda (NNA). Hishammuddin would later describe the keris as a "unifying symbol", stating that "The young people today no longer see it as a symbol to uphold ketuanan Melayu."

=== "Racial politics" ===
Chinese politicians within the government raised issues with the Constitution in late 2005. Lim Keng Yaik of Gerakan asked for a re-examination of the social contract to ascertain whether Bangsa Malaysia could be achieved. Lim was severely criticised by many prominent Malay politicians, including Khairy Jamaluddin and Ahmad Shabery Cheek. The Malay press, mostly owned by UMNO, also ran articles condemning the questioning of the social contract. Lim responded: "How do you expect non-Malays to pour their hearts and souls into the country, and to one day die for it if you keep harping on this? Flag-waving and singing the 'Negaraku' (national anthem) are rituals, while true love for the nation lies in the heart."

A year earlier, Abdullah had mentioned the most "significant aspect" of the social contract as "the agreement by the indigenous peoples to grant citizenship to the immigrant Chinese and Indians". Although Abdullah went on to state that the character of the nation changed to "one that Chinese and Indian citizens could also call their own," the speech went largely unremarked. Finally, Lim stated that the Malay press had blown his comments out of proportion and misquoted him. The issue ended with UMNO Youth chief Hishammuddin Hussein warning people not to "bring up the issue again as it has been agreed upon, appreciated, understood and endorsed by the Constitution."

In January 2006, the government announced a Rukunegara awareness campaign. The government press agency, BERNAMA, quoted the Tunku as saying in 1986 that "The Malays are not only the natives but also the lords of this country and nobody can dispute this fact". The articles of the Constitution touching on the official religion of Islam, the monarchy, the status of Malay as the national language, and Malay special rights were described as "clearly spell[ing] out the acknowledgment and recognition that the Malays are the indigenous 'pribumi' [natives] of this land." It was then stated that the new emphasis on the Rukunegara was to prevent further questioning of the social contract, which "decides on the political polarity and socio-economic standing of Malaysians".

Later, a survey of Malaysians found that 55% of respondents agreed politicians should be "blamed for segregating the people by playing racial politics". Mukhriz Mahathir — Mahathir's son and an UMNO Youth leader — defended UMNO's actions because of economic disparities, insisting that "As long as that remains, there will always be people to champion each race to equalise things." Shahrir Abdul Samad, the chairman of the BN Backbenchers' Club, argued that politicians were simply responding to "a country ... divided into different races," asking, "if you talk about Malay issues to the Malay community, is that playing racial politics?" M. Kayveas, the President of the PPP, disagreed: "Every 12 months, the parties go back to one race championing their own causes and, at the end of the day, when the general election comes, we talk about 'Bangsa Malaysia'."

Reflecting the mutual climate of distrust and racialist policies in both Singapore and Malaysia (in Singapore, the policies allegedly being pro-Chinese), Lee Kuan Yew sparked another debate in September on the role of Malay primacy in Malaysian politics, stating that the Chinese had been "systematically marginalised" in both Malaysia and Indonesia. The resulting diplomatic incident, with ensuing denials of marginalisation from Malaysian government politicians, led to Lee issuing an apology for his remarks which also attempted to justify them. Abdullah indicated he was not satisfied with what he referred to as a "qualified apology", but the Malaysian government accepted it nevertheless.

The following month, a controversy arose after the Asian Strategic and Leadership Institute (ASLI) issued a report calculating Bumiputra-held equity at 45% — a stark difference from the official figure of 18.9%, used by politicians to justify the retention or revival of the NEP. One local analyst suggested that "If Bumiputra equity is 45 per cent, then surely the next question is, why the need for Bumiputera rights? It has implications for government policy and it (removing indigenous rights) is one thing UMNO will never accept at present." The report's methodology was criticised for using market value instead of par value for its calculations of equity, and limiting its scope to a thousand publicly listed companies. It also included government-linked companies (GLCs) as Bumiputra-owned companies. Some, however, criticised the government, alleging that par value did not accurately reflect the value of the enterprises studied, and claimed that a portion of GLC equity should be considered Bumiputra-held. The report was later withdrawn, but the controversy continued after an independent media outlet cited a study following the government methodology that indicated Bumiputra equity had passed the 30% mark in 1997.

At the Johor UMNO convention that same month, Johor Menteri Besar (Chief Minister), Abdul Ghani Othman, criticised the Bangsa Malaysia and "meritocracy" policies. Ghani described Bangsa Malaysia as a threat to the Malays and their Constitutional position, suggesting it could "threaten national stability" as well. Ghani insisted that the policy "be applied in the context ... with the Malays as the pivotal race", and described meritocracy as a "form of discrimination and oppression" because rural Malay students could not compete with their urban counterparts. In the resulting controversy about his remarks, several federal ministers criticised Ghani, with one saying that Bangsa Malaysia "has nothing to do with one race given a pivotal role over others", and another arguing that "It does not impinge on the rights of Bumiputeras or other communities." Ghani stood by his comments, declaring that the proponents of Bangsa Malaysia were also advocating a "Malaysian Malaysia", as Lee Kuan Yew had, even though "the government has rejected it from the start." Najib, the deputy prime minister, suggested that any effort to define Bangsa Malaysia politically would be fruitless, and as such the debate was unnecessary; he also insisted that "It does not question the special rights of the Malays, our quota or anything of that sort." The UMNO Annual General Assembly that year was the first to be televised in full; it became a subject of controversy when delegates such as Hashim Suboh made speeches utilising heavy racial rhetoric; Hishammuddin, who had brandished the kris again, was asked by Hashim when he would "use it". After the assembly, Hishammuddin insisted that the kris was not a symbol of Malay supremacy.

In October 2007, Lee provoked more debate after suggesting that "If they (Malaysia) would just educate the Chinese and Indians, use them and treat them as their citizens, they can equal us (Singapore) and even do better than us and we would be happy to rejoin them." UMNO Information Chief Muhammad Muhammad Taib responded, telling the press that Malaysia implemented policies to assist economically disadvantaged Malays, instead of neglecting them as Singapore did, stating also that at one point the Malays would have to compete on a level playing field with other Malaysians.

=== Loss of BN supermajority ===
In the 2008 general election, BN was returned to power for the first time without its customary 2/3 supermajority in the Dewan Rakyat, meaning it could no longer pass constitutional amendments without the support of opposition parties. The election results were widely seen as reflecting discontent about the state of the country's economy and increasing ethnic tensions within the country; the three main opposition parties had campaigned on a platform condemning the NEP and the government's response to widening economic disparities. The month after, the Crown Prince of Kelantan Tengku Faris Petra said during an assembly organised by the newly formed Malay Unity Action Front that since the Malays had given in to granting the non-Malays citizenship, the latter should not seek equality or special treatment. In his speech, the prince also called for Malay unity to ensure that Malay sovereignty and supremacy was preserved.

Anwar Ibrahim, former UMNO deputy President and former Deputy Prime Minister, whose Parti Keadilan Rakyat became the second-largest party in Parliament after the elections, and the de facto leader of the opposition Pakatan Rakyat coalition, chose to instead reject ketuanan Melayu in favour of "ketuanan rakyat" (people's supremacy). Celebrating the end of his five-year ban from political activity on 15 April 2008, he told reporters: "We are here to counter the massive propaganda campaign by Umno leaders, who are talking on Malay supremacy. And giving clear definitive answer in reply of this, to say that what we want, what we desire for is a new Malaysia, is supremacy for all Malaysians." A week later, his wife Wan Azizah Wan Ismail, president of PKR, told the press that "we should not keep talking about Malay supremacy or marginalising a certain race, which is not what the people want to see," urging instead the adoption of ketuanan rakyat.

Not long thereafter, Hishammuddin himself apologised for his brandishing of the keris at the three previous UMNO annual general assemblies, saying he was sorry "if it had affected the non-Malays". He refused to comment on whether he would repeat the act in the future. His conditional apology was met with heavy criticism from within UMNO; one media outlet described the reaction as such: "The sentiment among many in the party is that the Chinese and Indians betrayed the BN when they voted for Pakatan Rakyat. There is hurt. There is anger. So why should Hishammuddin be too concerned about what non-Malays think of the keris act?" Many felt that the apology itself threatened Malay supremacy. Abdullah welcomed the apology, saying it was brave and "made it clear to the non-Malays the important role the keris had in the Malay community". In response to questions about the diminishing of Malay supremacy post-elections, he said that it was more about parity for the Bumiputra communities, rejecting the notion of political dominance:

So when we talk about (Malay supremacy), we mean we must be successful in many fields. It is never about ruling over others, or forcing our power upon them... We are not going to be a race that dominates others. We want to be a party that represents the Malays and that is ready to co-operate for the future of Malays and the people, as Malays will also succeed when all Malaysians are successful. ... That is Malay supremacy and I hope people will understand it.

Shortly thereafter, Information Minister Ahmad Shabery Cheek insisted that ketuanan Melayu did not imply a master-slave relationship in any sense between the Malays and non-Malays. Instead, he suggested, it referred to the institution of the Malay monarchs, who had once been the "masters", but gave up their primacy when the Federal Constitution was adopted at independence. Shabery cited Article 182 of the Constitution, which grants the royalty certain legal immunities, as an example of Malay supremacy. However, some prominent members of the royalty such as the Raja of Perlis and former Yang di-Pertuan Agong Tuanku Syed Sirajuddin Putra Syed Jamalullail have themselves been critical of ketuanan Melayu; in early 2009, the Raja stated that "In Malaysia, every race is tuan [master]... I believe that if everyone understands that every individual of any race, should not be deprived of their rights, then the efforts of certain parties who think that the supremacy or rights should only be given to a particular race can be stopped."

In late 2009, the Cabinet decided to change the curriculum of Biro Tata Negara (National Civics Bureau, or BTN) programmes, which are mandatory for public servants and students studying on public funds. Many, especially politicians from Pakatan Rakyat, had previously criticised BTN programmes as propaganda for ketuanan Melayu; citing this, the Selangor state government banned its civil servants and students from attending BTN courses. Some Ministers and former prime minister Mahathir defended BTN as necessary to imbue participants with the values of discipline and honesty, denying they had anything to do with ketuanan Melayu. Minister in the Prime Minister's Department Nazri Aziz insisted the Cabinet was right to demand a change in BTN, calling Mahathir a racist and saying:

They all know what the syllabus is all about so who are we to say that it did not happen? You want to lie? You make people laugh. I mean there are people who attended the courses who came out very angry. There were many instances of the use of words like ketuanan Melayu. It is ridiculous...

== Debates about direction of UMNO ==
Najib Razak soon succeeded Abdullah as prime minister, and his administration began a deliberate shift towards a more inclusive policy. The 1Malaysia programme was begun, and Najib increased direct engagement with the Chinese and Indian communities. In addition to reaching out to non-Malay voters, the initiatives relating to the economy were intended to help Malaysia escape the middle income trap. Specific proposals were brought up, such as reducing the percentage of shares in listed companies that needed to be held by Bumiputra from 30% to 12.5%, and creating new scholarships which did not take race into account. However, backlash against these ideas led to the retention of Bumiputra privileges in the New Economic Model economic plan, and further direct government economic intervention to support Malays. A new government agency, the Unit Peneraju Agenda Bumiputera (TERAJU or Bumiputera Agenda Steering Unit), gave contracts to Malays. Some within UMNO suggested pursuing the opposite political strategy, shifting right to appeal to supporters of the Malaysian Islamic Party (PAS). Outside of UMNO new pressure groups emerged to support the retention of the policies favouring Malays.

The 2013 Malaysian general election saw Chinese votes shift further towards the opposition, an event referred to by Najib as the "Chinese tsunami". Following this, the Najib administration shifted back towards a more openly pro-Malay stance. Racial tensions continued to worsen, with minority groups perceiving a decrease in tolerance among the Malay majority. Authorities were seen to tolerate Malay favouritism. In October 2013, an appeals court overturned a previous ruling allowing non-Muslims to use the word "Allah". Churches faced incidents of protest and arson. A public incident involving Indian students eating at school during an Islamic period of fasting led to the students having to change schools.

In the period leading up to the next election, infighting in UMNO increased, leading to defections including the creation of the breakaway Bersatu party. Bersatu was led by former UMNO Prime Minister Mahathir Mohamad, who later became the overall leader of a new coalition, Pakatan Harapan (Coalition of Hope). Other breakaway parties meant that in the end five parties with a Malay identity contested the election on various sides. This division saw UMNO lean further upon ketuanan Melayu to draw Malay votes, painting the opposition as a Chinese-led alliance that threatened Malay dominance, Islam, and the Malay Sultans.

== Government under Pakatan Harapan ==
The 2018 Malaysian general election saw, for the first time, the ruling Barisan National coalition led by UMNO defeated by the Pakatan Harapan alliance. Despite running campaigns distancing themselves from Najib due to 1MDB corruption scandal, UMNO-aligned Chinese parties were almost wiped out, with Pakatan Harapan (most prominently the Democratic Action Party) winning every Chinese-majority seat. Pakatan Harapan was multi-ethnic and ran on a platform of racial equality. Despite this, the Department of Islamic Development Malaysia, previously seen as an electoral ally of UMNO, saw its funding increased by the new government due to its political power.

In addition to a shift in non-Malay votes, the 2018 election also saw urban Malay votes shift away from UMNO. Malay voters and politicians who supported Pakatan Harapan were dubbed as "liberal" (pejoratively implying non-religious or impious) by their political opponents, who increased support for ketuanan Melayu to differentiate themselves from Pakatan Harapan. The intent of the new government to sign the International Convention on the Elimination of All Forms of Racial Discrimination and the Rome Statute of the International Criminal Court were portrayed as anti-Malay actions, as were the promotion of ethnic Chinese into senior political positions. The impact of Ketuanan Melayu was always stronger in West Malaysia than in East Malaysia, where the proportion of Muslims is lower and the population has been more integrated. However, as Ketuanan Melayu has become more prominent, and has taken on religious connotations in addition to its ethnic ones, tensions in East Malaysia have grown. For example, under leadership originating from West Malaysia, the Sarawak branch of PAS protested Christmas and New Year's Eve celebrations in 2018.

== Restoration of pro-Ketuanan Melayu government ==
A series of by-elections saw Malay votes shift back towards UMNO and PAS. These parties then formed the Muafakat Nasional coalition, on the explicit basis of promoting Malay-Muslim hegemony. Splits among Bersatu also emerged, dividing Pakatan Harapan along their views of ketuanan Melayu. Tensions erupted into a political crisis, which saw the downfall of Mahathir in favour of his Bersatu deputy Muhyiddin Yassin, who became prime minister with the support of a number of parties, including UMNO and PAS on a pro-ketuanan Melayu platform.

== See also ==
- Baasskap
- Bumiputera (Malaysia)
- Freedom of religion in Malaysia
- Malay Agenda
- Majoritarianism
- Master race

== Bibliography ==
- James Chin (2018) From Ketuanan Melayu to Ketuanan Islam: UMNO and the Malaysian Chinese (ISBN 9672165374).
- Abdullah, Asma & Pedersen, Paul B. (2003). Understanding Multicultural Malaysia. Pearson Malaysia. ISBN 983-2639-21-2.
- Adam, Ramlah binti, Samuri, Abdul Hakim bin & Fadzil, Muslimin bin (2004). Sejarah Tingkatan 3. Dewan Bahasa dan Pustaka. ISBN 983-62-8285-8.
- Goh, Cheng Teik (1994). Malaysia: Beyond Communal Politics. Pelanduk Publications. ISBN 967-978-475-4.
- Hickling, R.H. (1991). Essays in Malaysian Law. Pelanduk Publications. ISBN 967-978-385-5.
- Hilley, John (2001). Malaysia: Mahathirism, Hegemony and the New Opposition. Zed Books. ISBN 1-85649-918-9.
- Hwang, In-Won (2003). Personalized Politics: The Malaysian State under Mahathir. Institute of Southeast Asian Studies. ISBN 981-230-185-2.
- Jawan, Jayum A. (2003). Malaysian Politics & Government. Karisma Publications. ISBN 983-195-037-2.
- Josey, Alex (1980). Lee Kuan Yew: The Crucial Years. Times Books International. ISBN 981-204-448-5.
- Keith, Patrick (2005). Ousted! Media Masters. ISBN 981-05-3865-0.
- Khoo, Boo Teik (1995). Paradoxes of Mahathirism. Oxford University Press. ISBN 967-65-3094-8.
- Lee, Kuan Yew (1998). The Singapore Story. Marshall Cavendish Editions. ISBN 981-204-983-5.
- Lim, Kit Siang (1978). Time Bombs in Malaysia (2nd ed.). Democratic Action Party. No ISBN available.
- b. Maaruf, Shaharuddin (1984). Concept of a Hero in Malay Society. Eastern Universities Press. ISBN 9971-71-204-0.
- Maidin, Zainuddin (1994). The Other Side of Mahathir. Utusan Publications & Distributors. ISBN 967-61-0486-8.
- Means, Gordon P. (1991). Malaysian Politics: The Second Generation. Oxford University Press. ISBN 0-19-588988-6.
- Milne, R.S. & Mauzy, Diane K. (1999). Malaysian Politics under Mahathir. Routledge. ISBN 0-415-17143-1.
- Mohamad, Mahathir bin (1970). The Malay Dilemma. Times Books International. ISBN 981-204-355-1.
- Musa, M. Bakri (1999). The Malay Dilemma Revisited. Merantau Publishers. ISBN 1-58348-367-5.
- Noor, Farish A. (2005). From Majapahit to Putrajaya: Searching for Another Malaysia. Silver Fish Books. ISBN 983-3221-05-X.
- Ongkili, James P. (1985). Nation-building in Malaysia 1946–1974. Oxford University Press. ISBN 0-19-582681-7.
- Putra, Tunku Abdul Rahman (1986). Political Awakening. Pelanduk Publications. ISBN 967-978-136-4.
- Rashid, Rehman (1993). A Malaysian Journey. Self-published. ISBN 983-99819-1-9.
- Roff, W.R. (1974). The Origins of Malay Nationalism. Penerbit Universiti Malaya. No ISBN available.
- Sopiee, Mohamed Noordin (1976). From Malayan Union to Singapore Separation: Political Unification in the Malaysia Region 1945 – 65. Penerbit Universiti Malaya. No ISBN available.
- Federal Territory MCA Liaison Committee (Ed.), Malaysian Chinese. Eastern Universities Press. No ISBN available.
- Trinidade, F.A. & Lee, H.P. (eds., 1986). The Constitution of Malaysia: Further Perspectives and Developments. Penerbit Fajar Bakti. ISBN 967-65-0030-5.
- Von Vorys, Karl (1975). Democracy without Consensus: Communalism and Political Stability in Malaysia. Princeton University Press. ISBN 0-691-07571-9.
- Ye, Lin-Sheng (2003). The Chinese Dilemma. East West Publishing. ISBN 0-9751646-1-9.
