= Pendatang asing =

Malay phrase referring foreigners and immigrants

Pendatang asing, orang pendatang or pendatang is a common Malay phrase used to refer to foreigners or immigrants; pendatang asing literally means foreign comer or foreign immigrant. Although most frequently used to refer to foreign immigrants, especially illegal immigrants, pendatang asing has been used by some politicians in Malaysia as pejorative way of addressing non-Bumiputera Malaysians.

== Offensive usage ==
In a Malaysian political context, it is commonly used as a pejorative way of addressing the ethnic Chinese and Indians, who are not Bumiputera of Malaysia.

=== Pre-independence ===
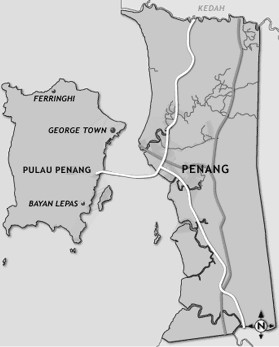
During the early 1950s, there was an active Straits Chinese secessionist movement in Penang agitating against ketuanan Melayu.

During the pre-Independence period, some Straits Chinese began taking an active interest in local politics, especially in Penang, where there was an active Chinese secessionist movement. They identified themselves more with the British than the Malays and were especially angered by references to them as pendatang asing ("aliens"). They avoided both the United Malays National Organisation (UMNO) and the Malaysian Chinese Association (MCA), believing that while UMNO and the Malay extremists were intent on extending Malay privileges and restricting Chinese rights, the MCA was too "selfish", and could not be relied on to protect their interests.

They had already raised their ire in the late 1940s, when the government proposed to amend the Banishment Ordinance — which allowed for the exile of Malayans "implicated in acts of violence" — to permit those born in the Straits Settlements to be banished to their ancestral homeland. This was a revolting idea for most of the Straits Chinese.

They were also uncomfortable about the merger of the Straits Settlements with Malaya, as they did not feel a sense of belonging to what they considered a "Malaya for the Malays", where they were not considered bumiputra ("sons of the soil"). One Straits Chinese leader declared, "I can claim to be more anak Pulau Pinang [a son of Penang] than 99 per cent of the Malays living here today." The secessionist movement eventually petered out, however, because of the government's refusal to entertain the idea of Penang seceding from the federation.

=== Post-independence ===
The phrase pendatang asing has strong connotations, and is often used in heated political situations. One example was the May 13 Incident of 1969, where racial rioting was triggered by a trading of political insults.

Another example was the prelude to the Operation Lalang in 1987 and the 1988 Malaysian constitutional crisis. In November 1986, MCA Selangor of which the MCA's deputy president Lee Kim Sai was its head, passed a resolution in its annual convention to make it an offence to call any of the three major races immigrants or pendatang. The resolution, which stated that Malaysia's three major races originated from other countries and that none of them should brand the others as immigrants and claim themselves to be natives. This was interpreted as challenging the bumiputra status of the Malays, and led to calls for Lee's sacking by members of UMNO. A compromise was eventually worked out whereby the term pendatang would not be used to describe any community and the bumiputera status of the Malays was not to be questioned. During this period, pro-Chinese organisations frequently traded insults with the UMNO, particularly its Youth Chief Najib Razak. At a rally in 1987 in Kampung Baru in Kuala Lumpur, banners were hoisted carrying phrases such as "revoke the citizenship of those who oppose the Malay rulers", "May 13 has begun" (referring to the 13 May racial riots in 1969), and "soak it (the keris) with Chinese blood". The tensions eased after Operation Lalang, when several political dissidents — most of them Chinese — were detained without trial under the Internal Security Act.

Tensions flared in 2004 when it was proposed to open the Bumiputra-only Universiti Teknologi MARA to all Malaysians. Malay media made comments about the pendatang making a "daring challenge to Malay rights".

=== Debate over its appropriateness ===
Non-Malay members of the opposition media have contended that the common use of phrases like "pendatang asing" validates their belief that non-Malay Malaysians are treated as second-class citizens. It has also been argued that the derogatory use of "pendatang asing" is inappropriate, as almost all of Malaysia's Prime Ministers have had foreign blood.

Nik Abdul Aziz Nik Mat, a former long-serving chief minister of Kelantan, referred to minorities as "sons of Kelantan" (Malay: anak Kelantan) to avoid the use of the term "pendatang". In 2021 Ibrahim Iskandar of Johor publicly opposed the use of "pendatang".

== Illegal immigrants ==
Since the 1980s when Malaysia first experienced economic boom, the country has seen massive influx of immigrants and foreigners from many neighbouring countries such as Indonesia, the Philippines, Vietnam and Myanmar. Recently, Malaysia has been the destination for many Bangladeshis, Indians and Pakistanis that are looking for employment. While many entered Malaysia legally, labour shortage in Malaysia has encouraged many employers to employ illegal immigrants. Of late, the Malaysian government has tried to repatriate many of these illegal immigrants back to their countries of origin. Such effort however has annoyed several governments including Indonesia and India.

== See also ==
- Article 153 of the Constitution of Malaysia
- Ketuanan Melayu
- Perpetual foreigner
- Gaijin – similar Japanese concept
- Goyim – similar Jewish concept
- Huan-a – similar Chinese concept
