= National Culture Policy =

Malaysian policy attempting to ethnically assimilate non-Malays

The National Culture Policy introduced in 1970 in Malaysia, emphasized an assimilation of the non-Malays into the Malay ethnic group. However, during the 1990s Prime Minister Mahathir Mohamad rejected this approach, with his Bangsa Malaysia policy emphasising a Malaysian instead of Malay identity for the state.

Malaysian National Culture Policy is defined in the "1971 National Culture Policy". It defines 3 principles as guidelines for 'national culture':

1. The National Culture must be based on the indigenous [Malay] culture
2. Suitable elements from the other cultures may be accepted as part of the national culture
3. Islam is an important component in the moulding of the National Culture.

The strategies to achieve this policy were:

- Restore, preserve and develop culture towards strengthening national culture through joint research, development, education and cultural expansion and connections.
- Increase and strengthen cultural leadership through training and guidance to interested individuals. Support and mobilize culture as an effective engine of growth.
- Establish effective communication to instill national awareness and Malaysian nationalism.
- Fulfill socio-cultural needs.
- Improve the standard and quality of arts.
