= Bangsa Malaysia =

Malaysian racial equality policy

The Bangsa Malaysia (English: Malaysian nation) policy was introduced by Prime Minister Mahathir Mohamad, to create an inclusive national identity for all inhabitants of Malaysia, thus abandoning the National Culture Policy that asserted a Malay ethnic national identity. Mahathir Mohamad said it means "people being able to identify themselves with the country, speak Bahasa Malaysia (the Malay language) and accept the Constitution."

The policy's support in the government appears to vary. Abdul Ghani Othman, Menteri Besar of Johor, alleged that Bangsa Malaysia was a "nebulous concept" which overstepped the bounds of the Constitution. "Even if the term Bangsa Malaysia is to be used, it must only be applied in the context of all the peoples of Malaysia with the Malays as the pivotal race," he said. However, Lim Keng Yaik, a Minister in the federal government, insisted that Bangsa Malaysia was an official government policy. Other Ministers also criticised Ghani's statement; one said that the policy "has nothing to do with one race given a pivotal role over others", while another said that "It does not impinge on the rights of Bumiputeras or other communities."

Deputy Prime Minister Najib Tun Razak argued that attempting to define the policy from a political viewpoint was pointless, as it had no official standing in the Constitution, and called for the debate to cease. He also said that "Bangsa Malaysia means we do not evaluate someone by his skin colour, race or religion," and contradicted Ghani, saying: "It does not question the special rights of the Malays, our quota or anything of that sort." Ghani insisted, however, that those advocating Bangsa Malaysia were echoing Lee Kuan Yew's call for a "Malaysian Malaysia" made during the early 1960s when Singapore was a state in Malaysia, even though the campaign had been turned down by the government.

One academic suggested that the conflict stemmed from the different meanings of the word "bangsa", which can mean either race or nation. Although the concept of a Malaysian race could be confusing, he suggested, taking Bangsa Malaysia to imply a Malaysian nation would be more sensible.

After the UMNO Annual General Assembly that year, Ghani elaborated that his opposition to Bangsa Malaysia and "Malaysian Malaysia" was because:

It is about everything being equal and this does not capture the hearts of Malaysians. Therefore, regardless of whatever name is given, the concept is similar and this is against idea kenegaraan (the idea of nationhood) which we have inherited.

Ghani defined his idea kenegaraan as "the idea that has united the Malays, and also the same idea that has given privileges to other races to be citizens, live together and share power and prosperity."

== See also ==
- Ketuanan Melayu (Malay supremacy)
- Malaysian Malaysia
- 1Malaysia
