= The Malay Dilemma =

1970 book by Mahathir Mohamad

The Malay Dilemma Dilema Melayu (in Malay)
- The front cover of The Malay Dilemma: With a New Preface
- Author: Mahathir Mohamad
- Language: English
- Subject: Non-fiction
- Publisher: Asia Pacific Press
- Publication date: 1970
- Publication place: Malaysia
- Pages: 188
- ISBN: 978-981-204-355-9
- OCLC: 246739691

The Malay Dilemma (Malay: Dilema Melayu) is a 1970 book by Malaysian politician and writer Mahathir Mohamad, who went on to be the country's longest serving Prime Minister.

In it, Mahathir describes his interpretation of Malaysia's history in relation to its multi-ethnic society and racial tensions, and advocates for affirmative action policies for Malays. The book was originally banned in Malaysia; the ban was lifted 11 years after its first publication after Mahathir became prime minister. Commentators have since noted its influence on Malaysian society and governance, particularly the New Economic Policy.

== Background ==
At the time of publication, Mahathir had just lost his parliamentary seat, been expelled from the ruling party UMNO and Malaysia had recently been rocked by the racial riots later known as the 13 May Incident.

== Summary ==
The book is a manifesto outlining Mahathir's political and racial beliefs. It analyses Malaysian history and politics in terms of race, and posits the following basic positions:

- The Malay race are the indigenous people (bumiputras) of Malaysia, and by definition follow Islamic faith
- The sole national language is the Malay language and all other races are to learn it.
- The tolerant and non-confrontational nature of the Malays has allowed them to be subjugated in their own land by the other races with the collusion of the British.
- A program of affirmative action is required to correct Malaysian Chinese hegemony in business.

The dilemma thus, was whether Malays should accept this governmental aid—and Mahathir's position was that they should.

The book has attracted controversy for making racial generalisations, such as describing "Jewish stinginess and financial wizardry" and calling Jews "hook-nosed". Mahathir proposes in the book that affirmative action policies be a solution leading away from violence towards a harmonious, integrated Malaysia, albeit one where political and economic power is firmly concentrated in the hands of the Malays.

== Initial ban in Malaysia ==
The book was banned in Malaysia upon its release, but was published in Singapore. Despite this, it was circulated widely. After Mahathir became prime minister in 1981, the 11-year ban was lifted after a proposal from Mahathir's deputy Musa Hitam.

== Impact ==
The book has been posited, including by Mahathir himself, as a major influence for affirmative action policies in Malaysia, most notably in the Malaysian New Economic Policy, which outlines racial quotas across Malaysian society in favour of designated bumiputera ethnic groups.

== Reception ==
In the preface of the book's first edition, its British publisher, Donald Moore, described Mahathir as "pessimistic about the future", but believed that "the author's views should be read — whether or not we share them". Mohammad Bakri Musa, in The Malay Dilemma Revisited (1999) states that his assertions and assumptions were based on his personal observations and experiences, with no empirical data to support them.

== External link ==
- The Malay Dilemma, Mahathir bin Mohamad, Donald Moore for Asia Pacific Press, Singapore, 1970 at Internet Archive
