= Malaysian Malaysia =

Policy opposing discrimination against non-Malay populations

Malaysian Malaysia is a political concept in Malaysia that holds that the state should not be identified with the supremacy, well-being, or interests of any particular ethnic community or race. The phrase became closely associated with Lee Kuan Yew and the People's Action Party (PAP) during Singapore's membership in Malaysia, and with the campaign of the Malaysian Solidarity Convention in 1965. The PAP argued that improving the economic position of the Malays required broader economic policies rather than an approach based primarily on race.

The campaign was opposed by politicians in the governing Alliance, particularly within the United Malays National Organisation (UMNO), who regarded it as a threat to the special position of the Malays. The concept continued to feature in Malaysian political disputes after Singapore's separation from Malaysia, including debates involving the Democratic Action Party (DAP), UMNO, the Bangsa Malaysia concept, and Malay and Bumiputra privileges under Article 153. In 2023, UMNO Supreme Council member Nur Jazlan Mohamed called on DAP to remove "Malaysian Malaysia" from its constitution.

== Definition ==
A Malaysian Malaysia means that the state is not identified with the supremacy, well-being, and interests of any one particular community or race. A Malaysian Malaysia is the antithesis of a Malay Malaysia, a Chinese Malaysia, a Dayak Malaysia, an Indian Malaysia, or Kadazan Malaysia, and so on.

— At the signing of a joint declaration calling for a Malaysian Malaysia, 9 May 1965.

== Early use ==
The phrase "Malaysian Malaysia" is widely associated with Lee Kuan Yew, then leader of the Singapore-based People's Action Party (PAP), the prime constituent in the Malaysian Solidarity Convention, who was foremost a critic against the raced-based economic policy.

British colonial rule had a major effect on the development of ethnic divisions in Malaya. Sociologist Charles Hirschman argues that modern racial boundaries in Peninsular Malaysia were a product of British colonialism in the late nineteenth and early twentieth centuries, which constructed a social and economic order structured by race and was accompanied by large-scale immigration from China and India.

In April 1965, a Singapore government statement by Ghazali bin Ismail reproduced an answer Lee had given in Adelaide about the special rights of Malays. Lee said that the constitutional provision for special rights was not itself the issue; he argued that the underlying problem was an economic imbalance between the Malays and the Chinese and Indian communities. He attributed part of this imbalance to colonial-era development, during which Malays had largely remained in agriculture and fishing while Chinese and Indian workers were brought in for mines and plantations. Lee argued that special rights and the allocation of licences would not by themselves solve Malay poverty, and instead advocated education, increased earning capacity, and improvements in agriculture. He contrasted this approach with Singapore's policy of providing free education to Malays.

The campaign for a "Malaysian Malaysia" was not viewed highly by the government of Malaysia and the parties in the ruling coalition of the Alliance (later the Barisan Nasional). Those against the concept of a Malaysian Malaysia cited the fact that Malaya was progressively colonised by the British from the mid-19th century to its height in 1926. During this period, a large number of immigrant labourers, including Chinese and Indian peoples, came to Malaysia and Singapore. They suggest that during the colonial era, the Malays were forced to accommodate other peoples. Those historic immigrants and their descendants allowed to remain after the nation achieved independence should understand their presence was a privilege, not a right. Such people said that the influx of immigrants had negatively affected the rights and resources of the Malays. The argument was made in spite of the existence of Malay-Chinese Peranakans since the late 18th century, as well as regular Chinese merchant presence in Malaya long before the arrival of the British. However, the Alliance and the PAP both wanted gradual integration of a Malaysian nation, the subtle difference was in emphasis and speed. The Alliance focused on the cultural emphasis, bringing the non-Malays into the norms of the Malays through the speaking of the national language which will precipitate a national identity. The PAP focused on the economic emphasis, helping the Malays compete with the non-Malays through sound economic policy with the focus on the new Malaysian consciousness. Neither disagreed on the fundamentals (national language, special position of the Malays) but disagreed with the other on accent and timing.

The political mudslinging eventually provoked a response from a segment of politicians in the United Malays National Organisation (UMNO) who thought Malaysian Malaysia threatened the Malays' special position in Malaysia. They considered Lee to be a dangerous and seditious trouble-maker; one politician called him a traitor to the country. The more moderate Prime Minister of Malaysia, Tunku Abdul Rahman, was perturbed by the campaign. He thought it would lead to trouble, as he believed that the Malays were not ready to compete without their special privileges. Singapore was ejected from the Federation in 1965.

== Contemporary use ==
In 1999, controversy was reignited when Lim Kit Siang of the Democratic Action Party (DAP, the former Malaysian branch of the PAP) called for a second campaign for a "Malaysian Malaysia". Then acting UMNO Youth Chief Hishamuddin Hussein responded by warning not to "play with fire," and accused Lim of politicising an issue that had been decided at independence with the social contract. Lim argued that the concept of a Malaysian Malaysia did not differ much from the government policy of establishing a Bangsa Malaysia (Malaysian race or Malaysian nation). Some noted that Hishamuddin's grandfather, Dato' Onn Jaafar, the founder of UMNO, had left the party to form the Independence of Malaya Party based on the concept of eliminating special privileges for the Malays.

In 2006, at the Johor UMNO convention, Johor's Menteri Besar (Chief Minister) Abdul Ghani Othman linked the "Malaysian Malaysia" campaign to those advocating the Bangsa Malaysia concept, insinuating that Bangsa Malaysia was a threat to the Bumiputra/Malay privileges granted under Article 153 of the Constitution. However, others criticised Ghani, with Deputy Prime Minister Najib Tun Razak stating: "It (Bangsa Malaysia) does not question the special rights of the Malays, our quota or anything of that sort."

In 2023, UMNO Supreme Council member Nur Jazlan Mohamed called for DAP to drop the slogan “Malaysian Malaysia” from its constitution if it wants to gain support from the Malays. UMNO was in a coalition government with DAP when this statement was made.

== 1Malaysia concept ==
1Malaysia or One Malaysia (Malay: Satu Malaysia) is a Malaysian idea introduced by the sixth Malaysian prime minister, Najib Razak on 5 April 2009. The main motto is People First; Performance Now (Rakyat Didahulukan, Pencapaian Diutamakan). Najib Razak explained the concept of 1Malaysia as: "We stand, we think and act as a Malaysia race. And we take actions based on the needs of all ethnic groups in our country; ("Kita berdiri, kita berfikir dan bertindak sebagai bangsa Malaysia. Dan kita mengambil tindakan-tindakan berdasarkan kehendak semua kumpulan etnik dalam negara kita;). While 1Malaysia does not seek to do away with Article 153 of the Constitution it does place a strong emphasis on protecting the rights and welfare of non-Malays. The 1Malaysia concept is to harmonise citizens of the country regardless of race without changing its racial identity.
