= Economic history of Malaysia =

Development of real GDP per capita, 1870 to 2018

Since its formation in 1963, Malaysia's economic performance has been one of Asia's best. Real gross domestic product (GDP) grew by an average of 6.5% per year from 1957 to 2005. Performance peaked in the early 1980s through the mid-1990s, as the economy experienced sustained rapid growth averaging almost 8% annually. Malaysia's economy was greatly impacted by the 1997 Asian financial crisis, but recovered.

High levels of foreign and domestic private investment played a significant role as the economy diversified and modernised. Once heavily dependent on primary products such as rubber and tin, Malaysia today is an upper middle-income country with a multi-sector economy based on services and manufacturing. Malaysia is one of the world's largest exporters of semiconductor components and devices, electrical goods, solar panels, and information and communication technology (ICT) products.

== Pre-colonial economy ==
The earliest form of economic output in the region began with agriculture. Wet-rice (sawah) cultivation was established in the major river valleys of northern Malay Peninsula (Kedah, Perak, Kelantan, Terengganu, Pahang) by the 14th century. In the south (Selangor, Negeri Sembilan, Melaka, Johor), expansion was slower due to peat soils, brackish water, and swamps. While in Borneo, sawah cultivation may have first appeared in highland areas like the Kelabit highlands. Coastal Borneo also adopted sawah cultivation, while interior populations (Orang Asli in the Peninsula and tribal groups in Borneo) relied on a mix of hunting, shifting cultivation, and some wet-rice farming. The relationship between shifting (ladang) and wet-rice (sawah) cultivation is debated, but both were often practiced concurrently in early settlements. By the 15th and 16th centuries, sawah cultivation became dominant in traditional Malay village economies.

Subsistence activities coexisted with the production of marketable goods to trade for items like metalware, glassware, pottery, and textiles. In the Peninsula, tin was a key export, traded with India as early as the 5th century AD. Borneo's iron deposits supported a local industry, notably at Santubong, which thrived from the 11th century onwards. Other major exports included forest products (rattans, aromatic woods, camphor, bird feathers) and sea products (tortoise shells, coral, pearls, trepang).

The Malay Peninsula had been a centre of trade for centuries. Various items such as porcelain and spices were actively traded even before Malacca and Singapore rose to prominence. The Malacca Sultanate controlled the Straits of Malacca from its founding in 1402 to the 1511 invasion by Portugal. All the trade in the Straits, and especially the spices from the Celebes and the Moluccas, moved under its protection and through its markets. Malacca overtook Java as the primary trade entrepot from China in the latter half of the 15th century; after the Portuguese control of Malacca, Aceh had overtaken Malacca as the terminus for Indian trade in the early 17th century. In fact, much trade bypassed Malacca after the Portuguese takeover, more goods began the overland trek in the north Malay peninsula and more ships took the alternate route of going through the west coast of Sumatra.

=== Early modern period ===
Increased migration from Qing China occurred in the 1720s had led to more tin and gold mining after the Haijin policy was reversed. Early urban centers were multicultural, with foreign migrants integrating as merchants and craftsmen.

On the eve of the British presence in the late 18th century, the Malay States operated under a feudal economic system modeled after Malacca's structure. These states formed along major rivers (which also defined state boundaries) and towns developed at river mouths, with villages lining the waterways. Rivers were the economic backbone, generating revenue through taxes and tolls on goods and people using them.

Malay elites and middlemen as well as indigenous peoples played an important role in the pre-colonial economy. Munshi Abdullah reported that in 1838, he observed how the Jakun people brought resin, rattan and aromatic woods to trade with Malays; Ali Iskandar of Johor in 1844 appointed headmen for orang asli in the Endau River area; while Temenggong Ibrahim posted Malay agents to supervise forest collection in the interior regions. Besides supplying his income through piracy, Temenggong Ibrahim also relied on orang asli and Malays to gather gutta-percha for export to Europe, driven by its growing demand for use in the manufacturing of underwater cables. It was also common for Malay chiefs to use Dayak labor in the mining industry. As the British made Colonial Singapore more open to trade, the rising demand pushed Malay middlemen to increase the supply of jungle products, disrupting the delicate balance that had long regulated sustainable harvesting.

The kangchu system was a form of plantation-based economic organization in 19th-century Johor, in which Chinese headmen (kangchu, meaning “lord of the river”) were granted authority over specific riverine territories to develop agricultural enterprises, particularly gambier and pepper cultivation. Initially, these rights were formalized through surat kuasa (letters of authority) resembling those given to Malay district chiefs, allowing the holder to open plantations, supervise labour and collect revenue. Under Temenggung Ibrahim and later Abu Bakar (r. 1862–1895), and later institutionalized through a surat sungai (river document), which evolved into contracts similar to European legal agreements issued to a kongsi. Many in the Chinese community was organized under a Kapitan Cina, with ultimate authority retained by the Johor ruler. The system facilitated rapid agricultural expansion and significant Chinese migration, with Johor developing hundreds of plantations and a large labour force by the mid-19th century.

== Colonial economy ==
British economic influence in the Malay States developed in three phases: the establishment of the Straits Settlements, formalized by the Anglo-Dutch Treaty of 1824; the use of diplomatic treaties to expand British influence; and the facilitation of organized capital and labor migration into the Malay States from 1850 onward. Additionally, the Straits government played a key role in Johor's economic development, partnering with the Johor government in the 1830s to establish opium revenue farms under the Kangchu system. The mid-19th century saw a large movement of capital and labour, mostly Chinese, into the Malay States. Global tin prices after the 1840s coincided with the discovery of large deposits of tin in Perak, Selangor and Sungei Ujong. Higher demand in tin further coincided with the end of the First Opium War in 1842 which saw the opening of Chinese ports that encouraged Southern Chinese labour migrants to Southeast Asia.

Before the 1874 Pangkor Treaty, Chinese economic involvement depended on Malay rulers, who relied on them to drive the economy. To access resources, Chinese agents aligned with Malay elites. After the treaty, this nexus weakened as Chinese entrepreneurs increasingly turned to the British for business opportunities, forming a strong colonial state-Chinese business alliance. Economic modernization further eroded Malay political power as the British sought to reduce the inefficiencies of the feudal system, though they maintained some Malay dominance to avoid political and financial costs.

Later, as the British started to take over as administrators of Malaya, rubber and palm oil trees were introduced for commercial purposes. Instead of relying on local Malays as a source of labour, the British brought in Chinese and Indians to work in the mines and plantations and provide professional expertise.

The demand for coinage was met through various silver currencies, including Spanish, East India Company, Mexican, British, and American trade dollars, which traded by weight. Between 1837 and 1857, British India's attempt to enforce the silver rupee in the Straits Settlements failed. With no control over precious metal supply, currency shortages arose, particularly from 1870 to 1893. Early banknotes supplemented metal coins, but a British trade dollar was only approved in 1893. In 1899, the Straits government introduced paper currency, gradually replacing banknotes and reducing silver backing until 1910.

== Post-independence ==
As Malaya moved towards independence, the government began implementing economic five-year plans, beginning with the First Malayan Five Year Plan in 1955. Upon the establishment of Malaysia, the plans were re-titled and renumbered, beginning with the First Malaysia Plan in 1965. Malaysia's economic development was remarkable, given its troubled beginnings in the early 1960s and the ethnic partitions that were inherited from centuries of segmented economic development.

In the 1970s, Malaysia began to imitate the four Asian Tiger economies (South Korea, Taiwan, the then British Crown Colony of Hong Kong, and Singapore) and committed itself to a transition from being reliant on mining and agriculture to an economy that depends more on manufacturing. In the 1970s, the predominantly mining and agricultural based Malaysian economy began a transition towards a more multi-sector economy. Since the 1980s the industrial sector has led Malaysia's growth. High levels of investment played a significant role in this. With Japanese investment, heavy industries flourished and in a matter of years, Malaysian exports became the country's primary growth engine. Malaysia consistently achieved more than 7% GDP growth along with low inflation in the 1980s and the 1990s.

Central planning has been a major factor in the Malaysian economy, as government expenditure was often used to stimulate the economy. Since 1955, with the commencement of the First Malayan Five Year Plan, the government has used these plans to intervene in the economy to achieve such goals as redistribution of wealth and investment in, for instance, infrastructure projects.

A legacy of the British colonial system was the division of Malaysians into three groups according to ethnicity. The Malays were concentrated in their traditional villages, focusing mainly on agricultural activities, while the Chinese dominated Malaysian commerce. Educated Indians took up professional roles such as those of doctors or lawyers, while the less well-off worked the plantations. Chinese businesses in Malaysia developed as part of the larger bamboo network, a network of overseas Chinese businesses operating in the markets of Southeast Asia that share common family and cultural ties. The Reid Commission which drafted the Malaysian Constitution made a provision for limited affirmative action through Article 153, which gave the Malays special privileges, such as 60% of university entrance (quota). However, after the May 13 incident of racial rioting in the federal capital of Kuala Lumpur, the government initiated more aggressive programmes aimed at actively establishing a Malay entrepreneurial class through direct intervention in the economy, aimed at alleviating poverty. This was done with the controversial New Economic Policy (NEP). Its main objective was the elimination of the association of race with economic function, and the first five-year plan to begin implementing the NEP was the Second Malaysia Plan. The success or failure of the NEP is the subject of much debate, although it was officially retired in 1990 and replaced by the National Development Policy (NDP). Current GDP per capita grew 31% in the Sixties and 358% in the 1970s, but this proved unsustainable and growth scaled back sharply to 36% in the Eighties. It rose again to 59% in the Nineties led primarily by export-oriented industries. This increase in GDP was brought about due to a shift from the traditional agricultural and resource based economy to one based on manufactured goods. From 1988 to 1996, Malaysia's economy expanded at 8 per cent, the second fastest after China, resulting in manufactured goods such as microchips and semiconductors making up 80 per cent of exports. Per capita income doubled from 1990 to 1996. Infrastructure projects were greatly increased in this time. Other countries looked to Malaysia at the time as an example for economic reform.

The rate of poverty in Malaysia also fell dramatically over the years. However, its precipitous drop has been questioned by critics who suggest that the poverty line has been drawn at an unreasonably low level. The rapid economic boom led to a variety of supply problems. Labour shortages soon resulted in an influx of millions of foreign workers, many illegal. Cash-rich PLCs and consortia of banks eager to benefit from increased and rapid development began large infrastructure projects.

== Tiger economy ==
=== Macro-economic trend ===
This is a chart of trend of gross domestic product of Malaysia at market prices estimated by the International Monetary Fund with figures in millions of Malaysian Ringgit.

Year	GDP nominal (US$ billions)	GDP nominal per capita (US$)	GDP PPP (US$ billions)	GDP PPP per capita (US$)
1980	24.567	1,769.237	44.581	3,210.652
1985	31.300	1,978.111	73.942	4,673.082
1990	43.370	2,374.169	120.178	6,578.833
1995	88.832	4,295.154	213.157	10,306.506
2000	93.789	3,991.908	292.345	12,442.913
2005	143.540	5,421.341	412.557	15,581.780
2010	247.539	8,658.666	565.112	19,767.002
2015	375.633	12,127.206	800.169	25,833.204

For purchasing power parity comparisons, the US Dollar is exchanged at 1.71 Ringgit only. Mean wages were $6.95 per man-hour in 2009.

From 1988 to 1997, the Malaysian economy experienced a period of broad diversification and sustained rapid growth averaging 9% annually.

By 1999, nominal per capita GDP had reached $3,238. New foreign and domestic investment played a significant role in the transformation of Malaysia's economy. Manufacturing grew from 13.9% of GDP in 1970 to 30% in 1999, while agriculture and mining which together had accounted for 42.7% of GDP in 1970, dropped to 9.3% and 7.3%, respectively, in 1999. Manufacturing accounted for 30% of GDP (1999). Major products include electronic components – Malaysia is one of the world's largest exporters of semiconductor devices – electrical goods and appliances.

During the same period, the government tried to eradicate poverty with a highly controversial race-based program called New Economic Policy (NEP). First established in 1971 following race riots, commonly known in Malaysia as the May 13 Incident, it sought to eradicate poverty and end the identification of economic function with ethnicity. In particular, it was designed to improve the distribution of wealth among the country's population. The NEP formally ended in 1991, however, much of it remains in effect through other governmental policies.

The influx of foreign investment led to the KLSE Composite index trading above 1,300 in 1994 and the Ringgit trading above 2.5 in 1997. At various times the KLSE was the most active exchange in the world, with trading volume exceeding even the NYSE. The stock market capitalisation of listed companies in Malaysia was valued at $181,236 million in 2005 by the World Bank.

Some of the more visible projects from that period are Putrajaya, a new international airport (Kuala Lumpur International Airport), a hydroelectric dam (Bakun dam), the Petronas Towers and the Multimedia Super Corridor. Proposals that were eventually cancelled include the 95 km Sumatra–Malaysia bridge (would have been world's longest), the Mega International Sea and Air port on reclaimed land in Kedah (would have been world's biggest) and the KL Linear City (would have been the world's longest mall and the world's first city built over a river).

Concerns were raised during the time about the sustainability of the rapid growth and the ballooning current account. The mainstream opinion prevalent at that time was that the deficit was temporary and would reverse once imported equipment started producing for export. In spite of that, measures were taken to moderate growth especially when it threatened to overheat into the double digits. The main target was asset prices, and restrictions were further tightened on foreign ownership of local assets. Exposure of local banks to real estate loans were also capped at 20%.

As was widely expected, the current account deficit did narrow steadily, year to year, from 9% to 5% of GDP.

Malaysia has the largest operational stock of industrial robots in the Muslim world.

Malaysia's capital market crossed the RM2 trillion threshold for the first time at the end of 2010. The capital market had achieved an annual compounded growth rate of 11% from RM717bil in 2000 due to rapid economic expansion and strong regulatory oversight that underpinned investor confidence in the Malaysian capital market.

== Asian financial crisis and recovery ==
One of the most significant events in the history of the Malaysian economy was the Asian financial crisis, which caused Malaysia's GDP to shrink from US$100.8 billion in 1996 to US$72.2 billion in 1998. The Malaysian economy's GDP did not recover to 1996 levels until 2003.

The year 1997 saw drastic changes in Malaysia. There was speculative short-selling of the Malaysian currency, the ringgit. Foreign direct investment fell at an alarming rate and, as capital flowed out of the country, the value of the ringgit dropped from MYR 2.50 per USD to, at one point, MYR 4.80 per USD. The Kuala Lumpur Stock Exchange's composite index fell from approximately 1300 to nearly merely 400 points in a few short weeks. A National Economic Action Council was formed to deal with the monetary crisis. Bank Negara imposed capital controls and pegged the Malaysian ringgit at 3.80 to the US dollar. It also fully suspended the trading of CLOB (Central Limit Order Book) counters, indefinitely freezing approximately US$4.47 billion worth of shares and affecting 172,000 investors, most of them Singaporeans.

Prime Minister Mahathir Mohamad refused economic aid packages from the International Monetary Fund (IMF) and the World Bank, unlike the other countries affected by the crisis. By refusing aid and thus the conditions attached thereof from the IMF, Malaysia was not affected to the same degree in the Asian Financial Crisis as Indonesia, Thailand, and the Philippines.

Regardless, the GDP suffered a 7.5% contraction in 1998. It however rebounded to grow by 5.6% in 1999.

To rejuvenate the economy, massive government spending was made and Malaysia continuously recorded budget deficits in the years that followed. Economic recovery has been led by strong growth in exports, particularly of electronics and electrical products, to the United States, Malaysia's principal trade and investment partner. Inflationary pressures remained benign, and, as a result, Bank Negara Malaysia, the central bank, had been able to follow a low interest rate policy. The Malaysian economy recovered from the 1997 Asian financial crisis sooner than neighbouring countries, and has since recovered to the levels of the pre-crisis era with a GDP per capita of $14,800. Despite the adverse external environment arising from geopolitical tensions and the outbreak of the Severe Acute Respiratory Syndrome (SARS), the Malaysian economy maintained its growth momentum, with growth in the first half of 2003 reaching 4.5 per cent, significantly higher than the 2.6 per cent recorded during the same period in 2002.

The fixed exchange rate was abandoned on 21 July 2005 in favour of a managed floating system within an hour of China announcing the same move. In the same week, the ringgit strengthened a percent against various major currencies and was expected to appreciate further.

In September 2005, Sir Howard J. Davies, director of the London School of Economics, at a meeting in Kuala Lumpur, cautioned Malaysian officials that if they want a flexible capital market, they will have to lift the ban on short-selling put into effect during the crisis. In March 2006, Malaysia removed the ban on short selling. Some of the measures taken by the Malaysian government in response to the Asian crisis, such as the ban on short selling, were swiftly adopted by the very countries that had previously been critical of the Malaysian response.

Regardless of cause and effect claims, rejuvenation of the economy also coincided with massive government spending and budget deficits in the years that followed the crisis. Later, Malaysia enjoyed faster economic recovery compared to its neighbours. The country has recovered to the levels of the pre-crisis era – as an example, the KLCI Composite Index reached 1,896 in 2014, significantly higher than the pre-crisis record of 1,275 in 1993. While the pace of development today is not as rapid, it is seen to be more sustainable. Malaysia is the world's largest Islamic banking and financial centre.

== Economic impact of COVID-19 pandemic ==
In early December 2020, Fitch Ratings downgraded the country's rating from A− to BBB+. Some, such as Hoo Ke Ping at the Kingsley Strategic Institute, suggested that this was because of a lack of communication between the new government and the ratings agency. Others, such as Carmelo Ferlito, from the Centre for Market Education, said it might require something more substantial as the recent budget lacked a strategy for the recovery as well as addressing the political tensions. Others such as Shan Saeed at Juwai IQI suggested that the agency had lots its relevance as the analysis was "behind the curve".

== See also ==
- Economy of Malaysia
- List of states and federal territories of Malaysia by household income
