= Ethnoreligious group =

Ethnic group also unified by a common religion

An ethnoreligious group (or an ethno-religious group) is a group of people with a common religious and ethnic background or, in some cases, a religious background exclusively. It can also be considered a sub-category of ethnicity, where members collectively believe that their shared religion is foundational to their ethnic identity.

In a narrower sense, they refer to groups whose religious and ethnic traditions are historically linked.

== Characteristics ==
The elements that are defined as characteristics of an ethnoreligious group are "social character, historical experience, and theological beliefs".

A closing of the community takes place through a strict endogamy, which is specifically for the community and that distinguishes an ethno-religious community, that is, as distinct from any other group.

== Defining an ethnoreligious group ==
In general, ethnoreligious communities define their ethnic identity by their religious affiliation or a combination of religious affiliation and other factors, such as language or territorial origin. Sometimes, ethnoreligious communities can be defined as ethnic groups with close associations with a religion that can be practiced by other ethnicities, such as Irish Catholics and Swedish Lutherans.

Some ethnoreligious groups' identities are reinforced by the experience of living within a larger community as a distinct minority. Ethnoreligious groups can be tied to ethnic nationalism if the ethnoreligious group possesses a historical base in or claim to a specific region. In many ethnoreligious groups, emphasis is placed upon religious endogamy and the concurrent discouragement of interfaith marriages or intercourse as a means of preserving the stability and historical longevity of the community and culture.

=== Jews ===
Prior to the Babylonian exile in the late 7th century BC and early 6th century BC, the Israelites had already emerged as an ethnoreligious group, probably before the time of Hosea in 8th century BC. The ethno-religious character of the Jewish people in antiquity has been expounded upon by scholars such as Salo W. Baron, who spoke of "the ethnoreligious unity of [the Israelite] people." This was expounded upon in 2001 by Shaye J. D. Cohen, when describing Jewish identity during the late Second Temple period.

Anthony D. Smith, the principal theorist of the ethno-symbolist approach to nationalism, argues that Iron Age Judah, under kings such as Hezekiah and Josiah, achieved the status of a full ethnic community, which he is willing to call a "nation". After this polity was abolished, Smith describes the post-exilic Jewish population as rebuilding itself under foreign rule, without a monarchy, as an "autonomous ethnoreligious community" centered on the Temple and the Mosaic Covenant. He argues that this community developed back into "the formation of a national community" during the Hasmonean and Roman periods, driven in part by the Maccabean Revolt (in the 160s BCE) and later articulated through Pharisee and Zealot expressions of national sentiment.

Jewish ethnoreligious national identity has historically included many diverse communities of Jews with divergent, schismatic, or outright heretical religious beliefs. From Classical Antiquity and the Medieval period to the Modern era, the majority of Jews worldwide were and are Rabbinic Jews. However, sectarian religious movements like Karaite Jews continued to be considered by the Rabbinic majority as part of the broader Jewish nation. Likewise, in the Modern era, Jewish ethnoreligious national identity continues to include both secular and atheist Jews.

There are multiple Jewish denominations within modern Rabbinic Judaism, each with their own opinions on the scope and applicability of Halakha (Jewish religious law). Reform Judaism, founded in mid-19th century Germany, has differed from Orthodox Judaism on matters of theology and practice; however, toward the end of the 20th century and into the 21st century, the Reform movement has reoriented itself back toward certain traditions and practices it had previously relinquished (for example, wearing the tallit and/or the kippah, also known as a yarmulke, during religious services; and the use of Hebrew in the liturgy).

Traditional interpretations of Jewish law recognize descent only along the maternal line.In the United States, the increasing rate of mixed marriages has led to attempts to facilitate conversion of the spouse, although traditional Jewish law strongly discourages conversion to facilitate marriage. However, if a non-Jewish woman marrying a Jewish man does not convert, Reform Judaism will recognize a child born of the marriage as Jewish based on patrilineal descent if that child has "established through appropriate and timely public and formal acts of identification with the Jewish faith and people," thereby self-identifying as Jewish. In actual practice, most Reform Jews affirm patrilineal descent as a valid means of Jewish identification, particularly if the individual was "raised Jewish." Reconstructionist Judaism takes a similar view, considering a child Jewish "if the parents have committed themselves to rear their children as Jews by providing circumcision for boys, Jewish education for boys and girls, and if the children fulfill the requirements for bar/bat mitzvah or confirmation." Like the Orthodox, Conservative Judaism does not recognize patrilineal descent.

In Israel, the Declaration of Independence expressly proclaimed Israel as a Jewish state, and many of the subsequent Basic Laws of Israel refer to Israel in similar language. Israeli national identity is thus linked with Jewish identity as a result of Zionism. In Israeli law, religious courts have authority over marriage and other personal status matters for their respective communities (which the state inherited from the Ottoman millet system as preserved under British Mandatory rule and codified in Israeli statutes). That religious courts have this authority instead of non-religious institutions has led to friction with, for example, secular Jews who sometimes find they must leave the country in order to marry or divorce. The majority of these cases relate to individuals not recognized as Jewish by the official rabbinate, to the inherited status of mamzer (a person conceived in certain forbidden relationships or incest), the marriage of males from the priestly line—kohanim (kohen), and to agunot, women who have not been able to receive a religious divorce decree from their husbands. The Israeli rabbinate recognizes only certain approved Orthodox rabbis as legitimate, which has led to friction with Diaspora Jews who for centuries never had an overarching authority.

=== Anabaptists ===
Other classical examples for ethnoreligious groups are traditional Anabaptist groups like the Old Order Amish, the Hutterites, the Old Order Mennonites and traditional groups of Plautdietsch-speaking Russian Mennonites, like the Old Colony Mennonites. All these groups have a shared cultural background, a shared dialect as their everyday language (Pennsylvania German, Hutterisch, Plautdietsch), a shared version of their Anabaptist faith, a shared history of several hundred years and they have accepted very few outsiders into their communities in the last 250 years. They may also share common foods, dress, and other customs. Modern proselytizing Mennonite groups, such as the Evangelical Mennonite Conference whose members have lost their shared ancestry, their common ethnic language Plautdietsch, their traditional dress, and other typical ethnic traditions, are no longer seen as an ethnoreligious group, although members within these groups may still identify with the term Mennonite as an ethnic identifier.

=== Examples ===
The concepts of ethnoreligious fusion and ethnic religion have been applied by reliable sources to the following groups:

Ethnoreligious fusion	Ethnic religion
Alawites; Amish; Cossacks; Doukhobors; Druze; Hutterites; Jews; Kalash; Mandaeans; Maronites; Mennonites; Molokans; Mormons; Parsis; Saint Thomas Christians; Samaritans; Serers; Sikhs; Yazidis	Armenian Apostolic Church; Assyrian Church of the East; Balinese Hinduism; Chaldean Catholic Church; Church of Cyprus; Church of Greece; Coptic Catholic Church; Coptic Orthodox Church; Coptic Evangelical Church; Druzism; Dutch Reformed Church; Eritrean Orthodox Tewahedo Church; Ethiopian Orthodox Tewahedo Church; Judaism; Kalash religion; Mandaeism; Maronite Church; Russian Orthodox Church; Samaritanism; Serer religion (A ƭat Roog); Sikhism; Shintoism; Tengriism; Tibetan Buddhism; Tigrayan Orthodox Tewahedo Church; Ukrainian Orthodox Church – Kyiv Patriarchate; Ukrainian Orthodox Church (Moscow Patriarchate)

In a broader sense, the concept of a religious ethnicity has been applied to communities—particularly minorities living in religious borderlands, belonging to distinctive religions or sects, and maintaining in-group boundaries—where religious and ethnic identities have historically reinforced one another through endogamy, sociopolitical and cultural separation, and clear religious distinction from neighboring groups. The following is a selective, non-exhaustive list of religious ethnicities, meeting several of the aforementioned criteria: Armenians, Assyrians, Baharna, Balinese, Bosniaks, Carpatho-Rusyns, Copts, Croats, Gorani, Greeks, Hui-Dungans, Iraqi Sunni Arabs, Irish Catholics, Lebanese Shia Muslims, Mahar, Malays in Malaysia, (Note: Only Malays in the federal state of Malaysia are legally defined as Muslims. The broader Malay ethnicity present in other states such as Thailand and Singapore are not legally defined as such. For the legalistic definition of Malays in Malaysia, see Article 160 of the Constitution of Malaysia) Moro Filipinos, Orthodox Antiochian Levantines, Pomaks, Serbs, Setos, Tibetans, Torbeši Macedonians, Ulster Protestants, Yugoslav Muslims.

== As a legal concept ==
=== Australia ===
In Australian law, the Anti-Discrimination Act 1977 of New South Wales defines "race" to include "ethnic, ethno-religious, or national origin". The reference to "ethno-religious" was added by the Anti-Discrimination (Amendment) Act 1994 (NSW). John Hannaford, the NSW Attorney-General at the time, explained, "The effect of the latter amendment is to clarify that ethno-religious groups, such as Jews, Muslims, and Sikhs, have access to the racial vilification and discrimination provisions of the Act.... extensions of the Anti-Discrimination Act to ethno-religious groups will not extend to discrimination on the ground of religion".

The definition of "race" in Anti-Discrimination Act 1998 (Tasmania) likewise includes "ethnic, ethno-religious, or national origin". However, unlike the NSW Act, it also prohibits discrimination on the grounds of "religious belief or affiliation" or "religious activity".

=== United Kingdom ===
In the United Kingdom the landmark legal case Mandla v Dowell-Lee (1982) placed a legal definition on ethnic groups with religious ties, which, in turn, has paved the way for the definition of an ethnoreligious group. Both Jews and Sikhs were determined to be considered ethnoreligious groups under the Anti-Discrimination (Amendment) Act 1994 (see above).

The Anti-Discrimination (Amendment) Act 1994 made reference to Mandla v Dowell-Lee, which defined ethnic groups as:

1. a long shared history, of which the group is conscious as distinguishing it from other groups, and the memory of which it keeps alive;
2. a cultural tradition of its own, including family and social customs and manners, often but not necessarily associated with religious observance;
3. either a common geographical origin, or descent from a small number of common ancestors;
4. a common language, not necessarily peculiar to the group;
5. a common literature peculiar to the group;
6. a common religion different from that of neighbouring groups or from the general community surrounding it;
7. being a minority or being an oppressed or dominant group within a larger community. For example, a conquered people (say, the inhabitants of England shortly after the Norman Conquest) and their conquerors might both be ethnic groups.

The significance of the case was that groups like Sikhs and Jews could now be protected under the Race Relations Act 1976.

=== Malaysia ===
In Malaysian law, as per Article 160(2), it is stipulated that an individual classified as Malay must be a Muslim, converse in the Malay language, and adhere to Malay customs.

According to this legal framework, a Malay man or woman who undergoes conversion from Islam to another religion ceases to be recognized as Malay. Consequently, the privileges accorded to so-called Bumiputra, specifically the entitlements outlined in Article 153 of the Constitution, the New Economic Policy (NEP), and other related provisions, are forfeited in the event of such conversions.

== See also ==
- Ethnolinguistic group
- Folk religion
- List of religions
  - List of ethnic religions
- Phyletism
- Religious assimilation
- Religious segregation
- Symbolic ethnicity

== Bibliography ==
- Sean Ireton (2003). "The Samaritans – A Jewish Sect in Israel: Strategies for Survival of an Ethno-religious Minority in the Twenty First Century". Anthrobase.
- Barry, David M. (2012), "The Relationship Between Religion and Ethnicity: A Review of the Literature", Popular Perceptions of the Relationship Between Religious and Ethnic Identities: A Comparative Study of Ethnodoxy in Contemporary Russia and Beyond, Western Michigan University, pp. 6–19
- Levey, Geoffrey Brahm (1996). "Toward a Theory of Disproportionate American Jewish Liberalism" (PDF). In Peter Y. Medding (ed.). Values, Interests, and Identity: Jews and Politics in a Changing World. Studies in Contemporary Jewry. Vol. XI. Oxford University Press. ISBN 9780195103311.
- Fox, Jonathan (2002). "Defining Religion's Role in Society". Ethnoreligious Conflict in the Late Twentieth Century: A General Theory. Lexington Books. pp. 11–30. ISBN 978-0-7391-0418-7.
- Lycourinos, Damon Z. (August 2017). Sutherland, Liam T. (ed.). "Modern Greek Ethno-Religious Nationalism: An Ideological and Spatio-Temporal Relocation of Selfhood". Implicit Religion: Journal for the Critical Study of Religion. 20 (1: Nationalism and Religious Studies - Critical Perspectives). London: Equinox Publishing: 23–41. doi:10.1558/imre.34128. ISSN 1743-1697. S2CID 149134963.
- Thomas, Martin (October 2006). "Crisis management in colonial states: Intelligence and counter-insurgency in Morocco and Syria after the First World War". Intelligence & National Security. 21 (5): 697–716. doi:10.1080/02684520600957662. S2CID 153922797.
- J. Alan Winter (March 1996). "Symbolic Ethnicity or Religion Among Jews in the United States: A Test of Gansian Hypotheses". Review of Religious Research. 37 (3). Archived from the original on 2008-10-15 – via Questia.
- Koonammakkal, Thomas (2013). Peter Bruns; Heinz Otto Luthe (eds.). "Syro-Malabar History and Traditions". Orientalia Christiana: Festschrift für Hubert Kaufhold zum 70. Geburtstag; pp. 259-276. Wiesbaden: Harrassowitz Verlag. ISBN 9783447068857.
- Yang, F. and Ebaugh, H. R. (2001), Religion and Ethnicity Among New Immigrants: The Impact of Majority/Minority Status in Home and Host Countries Archived 2016-04-15 at the Wayback Machine. Journal for the Scientific Study of Religion, 40: 367–378. doi:10.1111/0021-8294.00063
- Phillip E. Hammond and Kee Warner, Religion and Ethnicity in Late-Twentieth-Century America, The Annals of the American Academy of Political and Social, Vol. 527, Religion in the Nineties (May, 1993), pp. 55–66
- Perczel, István (2013). Peter Bruns; Heinz Otto Luthe (eds.). "Some New Documents on the Struggle of the Saint Thomas Christians to Maintain the Chaldaean Rite and Jurisdiction". Orientalia Christiana: Festschrift für Hubert Kaufhold zum 70. Geburtstag. Wiesbaden: Harrassowitz Verlag: 415–436.
- Gladney, Dru C. (1996) [1991]. Muslim Chinese: Ethnic Nationalism in the People's Republic (2nd ed.). Wiesbaden: Harvard University Asia Center. ISBN 0-674-59497-5.
