= New Economic Model =

Initiative to reform Malaysia's economy

The New Economic Model (NEM) 2011-2020 was an economic plan in Malaysia unveiled on 30 March 2010 by Malaysian Prime Minister Najib Razak which was intended to more than double the per capita income in Malaysia by 2020. The programme aimed to shift affirmative action from being ethnically based to being need-based hence becoming more competitive, market and investor-friendly.

== The plan ==
The goal of the NEM, according to Najib, is to "transform the Malaysian economy to become one with high incomes and quality growth" by 2020. At the time of the plan's unveiling in 2010, per capita annual income in Malaysia stood at 23,100 Malaysian ringgit, approximately $7,000 in US currency; the plan's stated goal is to reach RM49,500 (US$15,000).

The keys to the plan as described by Najib at 30 March unveiling are "high income, sustainability and inclusiveness". The goal is to stimulate economic growth by improving worker productivity across all sectors of society, in part through an improved system of affirmative action, with an eye towards sustainability. Among other reforms meant to accomplish this goal, the Najib administration have also claimed that the NEM is to empower the private sector and to reduce fiscal disparity between the wealthiest and poorest of Malaysians.

The plan is intended to replace the New Economic Policy (NEP). Najib criticised the way that the NEP had been implemented over its 40-year history, arguing that affirmative action policies of the NEP needed to be better targeted.

== Reaction ==
The Malaysian Chinese Association released a statement supporting the plan. Opposition leader Anwar Ibrahim responded to the plan's announcement by arguing the plan was "devoid of substance" and was designed as a publicity tool for the Barisan Nasional government. Malay activist group Perkasa expressed concerns that the proposed Equal Opportunity Commission could be unconstitutional if it did not accord with the protection of Malays afforded by Article 153 of the Constitution. A spokesman for Khazanah Nasional Berhad, a government agency, stepped out to support it as a "realistic outline", provided that it is effectively implemented and embraced by the public. Democratic Action Party spokesperson Tony Pua said that Najib's launching of a new unit to strengthen Bumiputera economic participation has nullified his own New Economic Model and is nothing more than an endorsement of the controversial NEP, which favours the influential elite, and a copycat of Mahathir's mega-projects and privatisation policies of the 1990s.

== See also ==
- Malaysian New Economic Policy
- National Development Policy
- Buku Jingga
