= First Malaysia Plan =

1966–1970 economic development plan

The First Malaysia Plan (1966–1970) was an economic development plan implemented by the government of Malaysia. It was the first economic plan for the whole of Malaysia—Sabah and Sarawak included—as opposed to just Malaya, which previous economic plans (such as the Second Malayan Five Year Plan) had confined themselves to. The plan's objectives were to promote the welfare of all citizens, and improve the living conditions in rural areas, particularly among low-income groups.

== Implementation ==
The plan attempted to increase access to medical facilities in rural areas through the formation of the Rural Health Service. District hospital facilities were upgraded to handle referrals from the clinics the Service operated. Medical subcentres were also founded in urban areas, and by the end of the Plan, the gap between rural and urban areas in terms of quality of healthcare had been narrowed, but not eliminated. East Malaysian (Sabah and Sarawak) medical facilities in particular were less-well equipped and staffed than those in West Malaysia (formerly Malaya).

Over M$470.8 million was allocated for education under the plan. However, less than 70% of this allocation was spent; in particular, the cost of training teachers and technical education had been overestimated. Between 1957 and 1970, the national literacy rate improved from 51% to 59%.

Shortly before the implementation of the plan, the former colonial masters of Malaysia, the British, announced they would withdraw their defence and economic commitments to Malaysia. As a result, the government sought financial aid from the United States (US) to avoid having the plan crippled by a lack of funding, going as far as to express support for the Vietnam War, which was unpopular among certain segments of the Malaysian populace. However, Malaysia never directly provided military support for the United States, in accordance with its policy of neutrality, and as a result, failed to receive substantial economic assistance from the US.

The First Malaysia Plan also had to address the problem of unemployment, which reared its head for the first time in the 1960s; despite encouraging growth in the Gross Domestic Product (GDP), employment rates had not grown at a commensurate pace. In addition, there was also the problem of ethnic specialisation in certain professions, with the Chinese dominating the marketplace, the Malays dominating the civil service, and the Indians largely participating in specialist professions such as law. The income disparity between rural and urban areas that the Second Malayan Five Year Plan had sought to resolve was also not satisfactorily eliminated.

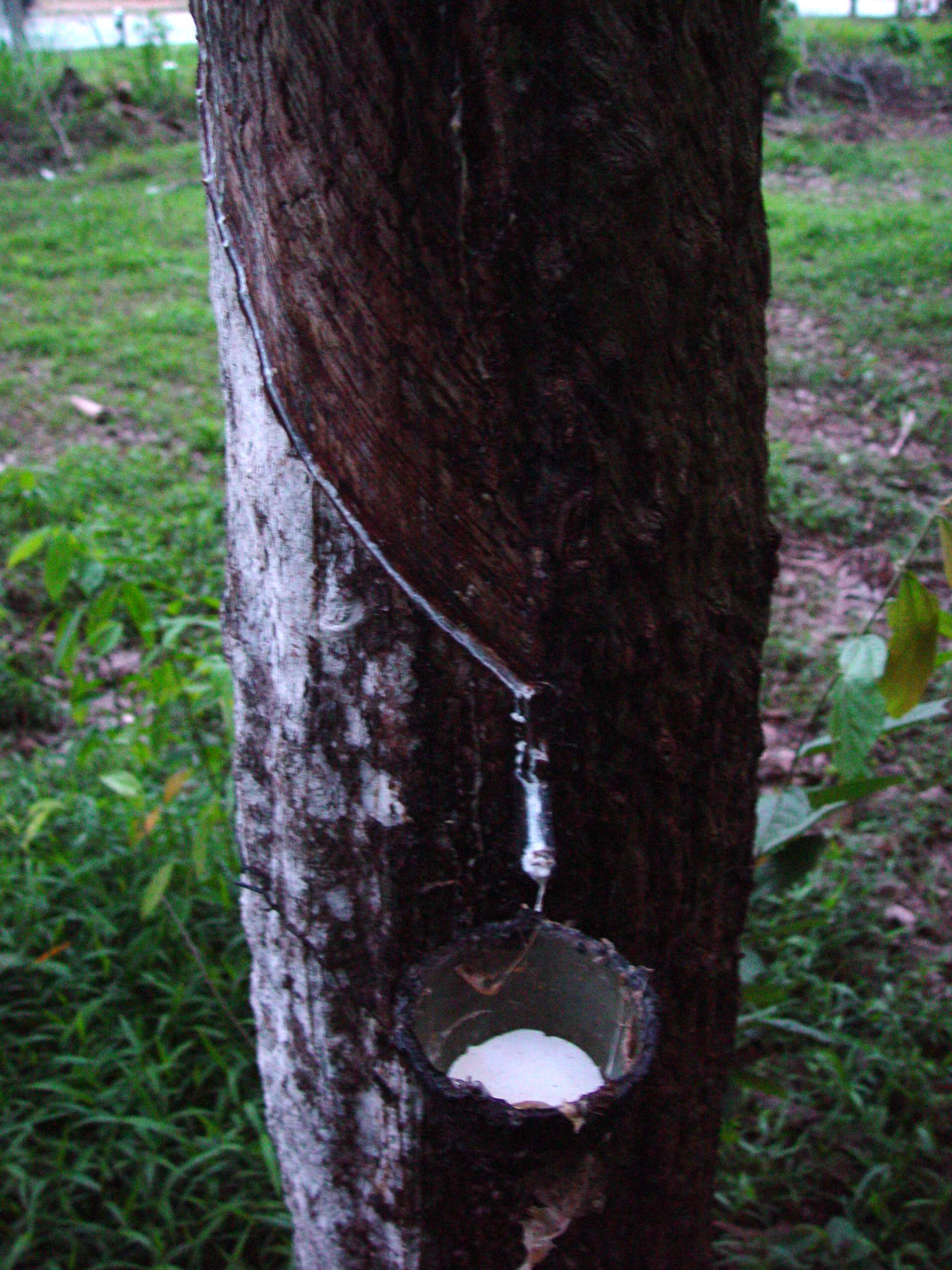
The government replanted hundreds of thousands of rubber trees to increase rubber yields.

In the rural, agricultural-centred areas, the government sought to continue the development that had been first brought about by the First Malayan Five Year Plan. During the tenure of the First Malaysia Plan, over 40,000 acres (160 km^{2}) of rice and other crops in East Malaysia were irrigated. The government also replanted hundreds of thousands of rubber trees to increase rubber yields; in West Malaysia alone, 304,000 acres (1,230 km^{2}) of small holdings were replanted. The government also attempted to rehabilitate inefficient coconut holdings, modernise fishing methods, and provide assistance to poultry and livestock farmers. However, the government also tried to reduce the Malaysian economy's age-old dependence on rubber, developing oil palm cultivation in West Malaysia, and developing the timber industry in Sabah.

The government also offered incentives to industrialise the Malaysian economy by promoting Malay entrepreneurship and upgrading Malay management skills for manufacturing ventures. The Federal Industrial Development Authority (FIDA), established in 1965 but only commencing operations in 1967, sought to accelerate industrial development further and co-ordinate such development. In 1968, new regulations were established that set quotas for Malay ownership of certain enterprises, and the employment of Malays in manufacturing ventures. (Such affirmative action policies were held to be in line with Article 153 of the Constitution.) New industries producing goods for the Malaysian market were required to have at least 51% of their equity in the hands of Malaysian citizens, but industries that would only export goods were permitted to remain entirely in foreign hands.

== Results and legacy ==
The government's ambitious plans to increase the standard of living in rural areas fell short of their objectives. Limited investment in social capital, despite the various land development schemes, had failed to either stem the tide of rural-urban migration or raise the incomes of rural families. In West Malaysia, 90% of all households earning less than M$100 a month were located in rural areas. The vast majority of these were Malay households.

However, the government's programmes to improve rubber output were largely successful. By 1970, the uniform-quality Standard Malaysian Rubber (SMR) comprised 20% of all rubber exports. The government also succeeded in reducing dependence on rubber at the same time by developing other fledgling industries.

Nevertheless, the First Malaysia Plan had visibly failed to reduce the inequity in the distribution of income. Discontent over this issue grew among the Malay populace, while the Chinese electorate, concerned by what they saw as more aggressive Malay "discrimination" against them, likewise became unhappy. In the 1969 general election, opposition parties advocating the reduction or elimination of Malay affirmative action policies made large gains in Parliament, nearly depriving the government of the 2/3 Parliamentary majority required to amend the Constitution—a majority the Alliance had always held since the first national elections in 1955. A victory march held by the opposition Democratic Action Party (DAP) and Parti Gerakan Rakyat Malaysia (Gerakan), both of which opposed the Malay-based economic policies of the government, turned ugly, with some participants shouting racial epithets at Malay bystanders. The United Malays National Organisation (UMNO), the leading party of the Alliance, in turn held its own march to "teach the Chinese a lesson". The march turned into a full-scale riot, later euphemistically labelled as the 13 May Incident. At least 200 people were killed, although unofficial estimates give a figure five times that, with the rioting lasting for two days.

The riot, whose participants had been largely from the lower-income classes, greatly concerned the government. A state of emergency was declared, and Parliament was suspended, to be restored in 1971. In the meantime, a National Operations Council (NOC) was established to govern the country provisionally. The NOC drew up the Second Malaysia Plan, the Outline Perspective Plan, and most controversially, the New Economic Policy (NEP) to address what it saw as an imbalanced distribution of income between the Chinese and Malays, and to reduce foreign control of the economy. Although the NEP's stated goal was to "eradicate poverty" and "eliminate the identification of race with economic function" through a "rapidly expanding economy", many non-Malays considered it to be "an open and blatant form of racial discrimination". The NEP expired in 1991, and was replaced by the National Development Plan (NDP). Despite the NEP's criticisms, it was also praised for having created a Malay middle class and creating a "greater ethnic balance in the professions".
