= Article 160 of the Constitution of Malaysia =

Portion of the Malaysian constitution

Parliament of Malaysia
- Long title: An article defining key terms used in the Constitution of Malaysia, particularly concerning Malay identity and privileges.
- Citation: Constitution of Malaysia, Article 160
- Territorial extent: Malaysia
- Enacted by: Reid Commission (drafting body)
- Enacted: 27 August 1957
- Commenced: 31 August 1957

Related legislation
- Article 153
- Status: In force

Article 160 of the Constitution of Malaysia defines various terms used in the Constitution. It has an important impact on Islam in Malaysia and the Malay people due to its definition of a Malay person under clause 2. It took effect after 31 August 1957 ("Merdeka Day" or "Independence Day") in the Federation of Malaya (now Peninsular Malaysia), and took effect in Singapore and East Malaysia when they merged with Malaya in 1963 to jointly form Malaysia. Although the article no longer applies to Singapore since its separation from Malaysia in 1965, it does affect the legal status of Malay Singaporeans when they enter Malaysia.

== Definition of a Malay ==
The article defines a "Malay" as a person who professes the religion of Islam, habitually speaks the Malay language, and conforms to Malay custom. They should also be a person who is

- (a) born before Merdeka Day in the Federation or in Singapore or born of parents one of whom was born in the Federation or in Singapore, or is on that day domiciled in the Federation or in Singapore; or
- (b) the issue of such a person.

As a result, Malay citizens who convert out of Islam are no longer considered Malay under the law. Hence, the bumiputra privileges afforded to Malays under Article 153 of the Constitution, the New Economic Policy (NEP), etc. are forfeit for such converts. Those who converted to another religion have created a number of legal issues.

Likewise, a non-Malay Malaysian who converts to Islam can lay claim to Bumiputra privileges, provided he meets the other conditions.
