= Ali Baba (business practice) =

Ali Baba is a term describing business practices in Malaysia and Indonesia involving indigenous and non-indigenous cooperation to take advantage of affirmative action provisions favouring indigenous Malays or Native Indonesians. In this arrangement, a Malay or Indonesian becomes the front person for a firm which is financed and run by a Chinese person (who may be a local citizen).

== Malaysia ==
Ali Baba is a business practice in Malaysia, where a Malay company obtains a contract from the government-sponsored affirmative action system for the Bumiputera (the Malaysian New Economic Policy under Ketuanan Melayu) and subcontracts it to an ethnically Chinese-owned company. The “Ali”, which is a typical Muslim name, refers to the Malay; the “Baba” the Chinese, from the Baba-Nyonya (Straits Chinese) people.

== Indonesia ==
The term Ali Baba came into usage when Iskaq Tjokrohadisurjo was Minister of Economics in the First Ali Sastroamidjojo Cabinet.(30 July 1953 – 11 August 1955) with the enactment of restrictive policies on foreign & Chinese investment. (e.g. providing state bank credit only for indigenous companies, & requiring that within 10 years, companies investing under domestic investment law be 75% owned by indigenous peoples.)

=== Purpose ===
This program was enacted to advance and improve the socioeconomic status of the pribumi by promoting greater economic equity between foreign investors, the Chinese, and the indigenous peoples, to facilitate the transition of the Indonesian economy from a colonial system to a national one, and to encourage cooperation between pribumi and non-pribumi businessmen. Ali (a typical Muslim name) represents pribumi, while Baba (sometimes a collective name for peranakan Chinese), represents non-pribumi and is associated with Chinese Indonesians.

=== Practice ===
When this program was in effect, pribumi businessmen were ordered to provide training and employment to the Indonesian native population, as the government only provided loans and licenses to businesses where some extent of capital came from the locals. The government also provided protections that allowed locally owned businesses to compete with foreign ones. However, this program was largely seen as a failure, as Chinese entrepreneurs adapted and continued to play an important role by setting up ‘Ali Baba’ arrangements, in which an indigenous businessman (Ali) was the frontman for the Chinese capitalist (Baba) who is generally in charge of the business.
