= Bumiputera (Malaysia) =

Indigenous Malaysian peoples

Bumiputera or bumiputra (Jawi: بوميڤوترا, Native), often shortened to Bumi in casual contexts, is a term used in Malaysia to refer to the Malays, the Orang Asli of Peninsular Malaysia, various indigenous peoples of East Malaysia and certain Peranakan sub-groups. The term, rooted in the Sanskrit word later absorbed into the classical Malay bhumiputra (Sanskrit: भूमिपुत्र, romanized: bhū́miputra), literally translates as "son of the land" or "son of the soil". In Indonesia, a related term, "Pribumi", is used, although in Malaysia it more broadly denotes indigenous peoples.

Following the 13 May incident in 1969, the government implemented the New Economic Policy (NEP), a set of measures granting extensive social, economic and political advantages to bumiputera communities. These included affirmative action in education, housing and preferential treatment in the public sectors, officially aimed at improving the socioeconomic position of the bumiputera and appeasing the Malay majority by granting them a constitutionally enshrined privileged status over Malaysian citizens who are Chinese or Indians. Although originally presented as a temporary solution to interethnic tensions, the policy has remained in force for decades and has been described as a form of institutional racism.

While such policies have contributed to the emergence of a substantial urban Malay middle class, they have done comparatively little to eliminate poverty within rural areas. Critics argue that the system entrenches ethnic hierarchies by privileging one group at the expense of minorities, creating an enduring imbalance in economic opportunity, political representation and access to resources. This has led to allegations that Malaysia's governance structure perpetuates inequality as a matter of state policy, leaving minority communities marginalised and, in some cases, dispossessed.

== Official definition ==
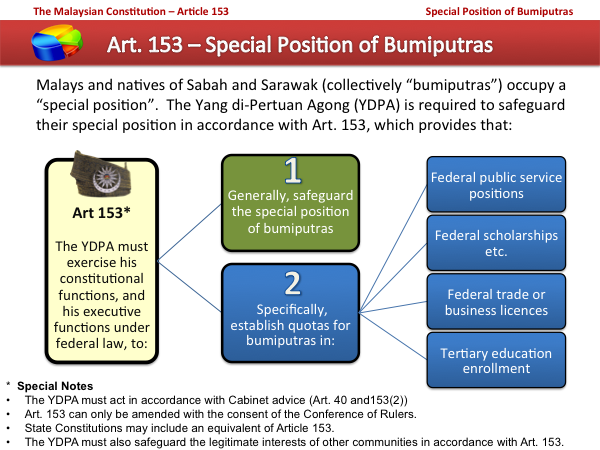
A diagram of the special position of bumiputera under the Malaysian Constitution

The concept of a bumiputera ethnic group in Malaysia was coined by Abdul Razak Hussein. It recognised the "special position" of the Malays provided in the Constitution of Malaysia, in particular Article 153. However, the constitution does not use the term bumiputera; it defines only "Malay" and "aboriginal peoples" (Article 160(2)), "natives" of Sarawak (161A(6)(a)), and "natives" of Sabah (Article 161A(6) (b)). Definitions of bumiputera in public use vary among different institutions, organisations, and government departments and agencies.

In the parliamentary debate of 13 November 1965, the Prime Minister, Tunku Abdul Rahman, was asked by Lim Chong Eu if there is a "legal and constitutional definition of the term "Bumiputera", and whether the children of Malaysian citizens who were born after 31 August 1963, will also be entitled to all the rights of "Bumiputera". To this, Tunku replied: "Mr Speaker, Sir, the term 'Bumiputera'...has no legal meaning except in so far as to denote the natives of the mainland of Malaya and the natives of the Borneo States". He later qualified that the benefits under Article 153 were for "the natives of Malaysia…who are less advanced and less able to compete with these other Malaysians".

In the book Buku Panduan Kemasukan ke Institusi Pengajian Tinggi Awam, Program Pengajian Lepasan SPM/Setaraf Sesi Akademik 2007/2008 (Guidebook for entry into public higher learning institutions for SPM/equivalent graduates for academic year 2007/2008), the Malaysian Higher Education Ministry defined bumiputra as follows, depending on the region of origin of the individual applicant:

1. Peninsular Malaysia
  - "If one of the parents is Muslim Malay/Orang Asli as stated in Article 160 (2) Federal Constitution of Malaysia; thus the child is considered as a Bumiputera"
2. Sabah
  - "If the child was born in Sabah or the father was domiciled in Sabah at the time of birth, and one of the parents is an indigenous native of Sabah as stated in Article 161A (6)(b) Federal Constitution of Malaysia, the child is considered as a Bumiputera"
3. Sarawak
  - "If both of the parents are indigenous natives of Sarawak as stated in Article 161A (6)(a) Federal Constitution of Malaysia; thus their child is considered as a Bumiputera"

In addition to the interpretation given above, a broader definition of bumiputera include groups such as native Indonesians, Malaysian Siamese, Muslim Indian Malaysians, Peranakans, and the Kristang people of Portuguese-Eurasian descent. Most of these encompass communities that were established in southeast Asia prior to the period of British colonial rule which saw large-scale immigration from China. Others favour a definition encompassing all children of bumiputera.

In Sarawak, there were cases of people with one bumiputera parent and one non-bumiputera parent being dismissed as non-bumiputera. However, this law was changed in 2022.

== History ==
At the time of Malaya's independence from British colonial rule in 1957, the population included many first- or second-generation immigrants who had come to fill manpower needs as indentured labourers, among rich Chinese merchants and settlers who brought their wealth and investment into Malaysia.

Chinese immigrants, who typically settled in urban areas, played a significant role in the commercial sector after the Indians left the country to return to India, much of the commercial sector was taken over by wealthy Chinese merchants. The Communities Liaison Committee (CLC), comprising leading politicians from different racial backgrounds, supported the promotion of economic equality for the Malays, conditional on political equality for the non-Malays. CLC member E.E.C. Thuraisingham later said, "I and others believed that the backward Malays should be given a better deal. Malays should be assisted to attain parity with non-Malays to forge a united Malayan Nation of equals."

Article 153 of the Constitution states that,

It shall be the responsibility of the Yang di-Pertuan Agong to safeguard the special position of the Malays and natives of any of the States of Sabah and Sarawak and the legitimate interests of other communities in accordance with the provisions of this Article.

Article 160 defines a Malay as being one who "professes the religion of Islam, habitually speaks the Malay language, conforms to Malay customs and is the child of at least one parent who was born within the Federation of Malaysia before independence of Malaya on 31 August 1957, or the issue of such a person."

Article 8 of the Constitution, states that all Malaysian citizens shall be equal under the law, and "Except as expressly authorised by this Constitution, there shall be no discrimination against citizens on the ground only of religion, race, descent or place of birth in any law or in the appointment to any office or employment under a public authority or in the administration of any law relating to the acquisition, holding or disposition of property or the establishing or carrying on of any trade, business, profession, vocation or employment." Article 153 itself expressly forbids particular forms of discrimination; clause 5 states that "All persons of whatever race in the same grade in the service of the Federation shall, subject to the terms and conditions of their employment, be treated impartially," while clause 9 states: "Nothing in this Article shall empower Parliament to restrict business or trade solely for the purpose of reservations for Malays."

The concept of the bumiputera's special position has been disputed. The Reid Commission, which drafted the Constitution, initially proposed that Article 153 expire after 15 years unless renewed by Parliament. This qualification was struck from the final draft. After the 13 May Incident in 1969, representatives within the government argued over whether the special position of the bumiputera should have a sunset clause.

Ismail Abdul Rahman argued that "the question be left to the Malays themselves because ... as more and more Malays became educated and gained self-confidence, they themselves would do away with this 'special position'." Ismail believed the special position was "a slur on the ability of the Malays." In 1970, however, one member of the Cabinet said that Malay special rights would remain for "hundreds of years to come."

In the 1970s, the government implemented the New Economic Policy (NEP), designed to be a more aggressive form of affirmative action for the bumiputera than Article 153. Article 153 provides specifically for the use of quotas in the granting of scholarships, positions in the civil service, and business licences, as well as native reservations of land. Policies under the rubric of the NEP include subsidies for real estate purchases, quotas for public equity shares, and general subsidies to bumiputera businesses.

Former Prime Minister Abdullah Ahmad Badawi and his predecessor Mahathir Mohamad have both suggested that Malays should depend less on government assistance. Many observers believe full abolition of bumiputera privileges is unlikely, especially in view of the constitutional issues involved, although successive administrations since Mahathir have attempted to reform the system of government aid for the bumiputera. Some bumiputera groups believe further affirmative action is necessary.

Parliament began to use the term bumiputra in 1965. Following debate of the act to create the Majlis Amanah Rakyat (MARA), the government founded an agency to preserve bumiputera interests.

In July 2017, Prime Minister Najib Razak said that the government would consider the request of the Muslim Indian community to be recognized as bumiputera, in what is seen as a move to woo voters in the lead-up to the upcoming general election.

== Contentious policy ==
Most Bumiputera policies were established during the Malaysian New Economic Policy (NEP) period as affirmative action for Bumiputera. The policies provide race-based, not needs-based, privileges to certain ethnic groups in Malaysia such as quotas for the following: admission to government educational institutions, eligibility for public scholarships, marking of university exam papers, special bumiputera-only classes prior to end-of-term exams in universities, positions in government, and ownership of businesses.

Other examples of Bumiputera policies include the following:

- Companies listed on the Kuala Lumpur Stock Exchange (Bursa Saham Kuala Lumpur) had to have at least 30% Bumiputera ownership of equity to satisfy listing requirements. Foreign companies operating in certain sectors faced similar requirements. In 2009, the Malaysian government phased this policy out in most service sectors, and public listing requirements were also amended.
- Developers must allocate 30–70% of residential lots to Bumiputera. Additionally, they must provide a minimum discount of 7% to Bumiputera buyers of these lots. All Bumiputera, regardless of income level, qualify for these privileges. After a certain period of time, any unsold lots may be sold to non-Bumiputera if the developer proves attempts have been made to fulfil the requirement. There is no Bumiputera discount on existing housing.
- A basket of government-run (and profit-guaranteed) mutual funds are available for purchase by bumiputera only. The Amanah Saham Nasional (ASN) has return rates approximately 3 to 5 times that of local commercial banks.
- Many government-tendered projects require that companies submitting tenders be bumiputera owned. This requirement has led to non-bumiputera teaming up with bumiputera companies to obtain projects, in a practice known as "Ali Baba". Ali, the bumiputera, is included solely to satisfy this requirement, and Baba (the non-bumiputera) pays Ali a certain sum in exchange.
- Projects were earmarked for bumiputera contractors to enable them to gain expertise in various fields.
- Approved Permits (APs) for automobiles preferentially allow bumiputera to import vehicles. Automotive companies wishing to bring in cars need to have an AP to do so. APs were originally created to allow bumiputera participation in the automotive industry, since they were issued to companies with at least 70% bumiputera ownership. In 2004, The Edge (a business newspaper) estimated that APs were worth approximately RM 35,000 each. They also estimated that the late Nasimuddin Amin, the former chairman of the Naza group, received 6,387 in 2003, making him the largest single recipient of APs. More than 12,200 APs were issued in 2003. In addition to APs, foreign car marquees are required to pay between 140% and 300% import duty.

In a report titled 2012 Investment Climate Statement – Malaysia published by the Bureau of Economic and Business Affairs (US Department of State), the reality of the Bumiputera policy was described as follows:

Many of the preference policies are opaque, with details of implementation largely left to the various ministries and civil servants within those ministries. Policies and practices vary greatly. Some practices are explicit and contained in law or regulation, while others are informal, leaving much ambiguity for potential investors. The civil service itself is subject to bumiputera hiring preferences. The NEM [New Economic Model] proposes reforming ethnic preferences in business ownership and social safety net programs. Some conservative bumiputera groups have voiced strong opposition to any significant changes to the extensive preferences.

As a result of these policies, many Bumiputera with good connections quickly became millionaires. According to Rafidah Aziz, former Minister of Trade and Industry, the policy was to create "Towering Malays". In 2005 she gave a speech that stated: "If there are young Malay entrepreneurs whose companies are successful, then we appreciate their success, we want Towering Malays of glokal (global and local) standard". She also said that the policy of Approved Permits (APs) had produced many bumiputera entrepreneurs in the automotive industry.

Since 2000, the government has discussed phasing out certain affirmative action programs and reinstating "meritocracy". In 2003 it began the system of "Malaysian model meritocracy" for university admission. Admission to public universities was not based upon a common examination such as the SAT or A-Levels, but rather upon a two parallel systems of either a one-year matriculation course or a two-year STPM (Malaysian Higher School Certificate) programme. Bumiputera compose an overwhelming majority of entrants to the matriculation programme. It is a commonly held belief that the public university entry requirements are easier for matriculation students and disproportionately difficult for STPM students.

Quotas also exist for Public Services Department (JPA) scholarships, full scholarships offered to students to study in leading universities worldwide. These scholarships are given on the basis of SPM (Sijil Pelajaran Malaysia, the equivalent of O-Levels) results, ethnic group, and certain quotas. The JPA scholars are sent to selected pre-university programmes offered by the government – from there, they apply to universities.

== Opposition to the bumiputera policy ==
=== Early opposition ===
In the 1965 session of Parliament, Singapore's Prime Minister Lee Kuan Yew (who was also a member of that Parliament) questioned the implementation of Malay rights as proposed. Lee asked, "How does the Malay in the kampung find his way out into this modernised civil society? By becoming servants of the 0.3 per cent who would have the money to hire them to clean their shoe, open their motorcar doors?" and "How does telling a Malay bus driver that he should support the party of his Malay director (UMNO) and the Chinese bus conductor to join another party of his Chinese director (MCA) – how does that improve the standards of the Malay bus driver and the Chinese bus conductor who are both workers in the same company?"

Lee closed with "Meanwhile, whenever there is a failure of economic, social and educational policies, you come back and say, oh, these wicked Chinese, Indian and others opposing Malay rights. They don't oppose Malay rights. They, the Malay, have the right as Malaysian citizens to go up to the level of training and education that the more competitive societies, the non-Malay society, has produced. That is what must be done, isn't it? Not to feed them with this obscurantist doctrine that all they have got to do is to get Malay rights for the few special Malays and their problem has been resolved."

=== Policy apologists and ongoing opposition ===
At the 2004 annual general assembly of the United Malays National Organisation, which is the largest member of the governing coalition, deputy chair Badruddin Amiruldin cautioned against questioning the bumiputera's special rights, which met with approval from the delegates: "Let no one from the other races ever question the rights of Malays on this land. Don't question the religion because this is my right on this land." In 2004, Mohd. Johari Baharum, parliamentary secretary of the Prime Minister's Department, stated that the PSD scholarships would remain quota based. He added that there were no plans to convert this to a merit based system, and that the total value of the PSD scholarship since 1996 was 2.4 billion ringgit.

Another controversial aspect is that the Orang Asli of Peninsular Malaysia are not considered bumiputera under the federal constitution. As their settlement predates that of the Malays, it is considered by many, that bumiputera is about the promotion one religion over another, especially since Orang Asli are much worse off than Muslim Malays. Others argue that the Orang Asli are in fact considered bumiputera.

On 1 March 2009, Nik Abdul Aziz Nik Mat, the spiritual leader of the opposition Pan-Malaysian Islamic Party stated that the term bumiputera is racist and the policy prevented other races from receiving government aid. Nik Aziz's remarks were made in response to the criticisms and threats made by UMNO against Democratic Action Party's Boo Cheng Hau, the opposition leader in Johor when Boo was reported to have compared "bumiputeraism" with state apartheid.

On 1 February 2015, Swiss academic Tariq Ramadan reflected on how non-Muslims have been treated as second class citizens. He stated, "I'm sorry but some of your fellow citizens in this country who are not Muslims are facing this discrimination, they are facing injustices."

== Present condition of the bumiputera ==
In 2006, the Minister of Higher Education, Mustapa Mohamad, stated that he wanted public universities to recruit more non-bumiputera academic staff to "strive for world-class institutions", which may have signalled a move toward less racial discrimination in academia. However this does not affect entry into universities, which is still designed to restrict other races' access to higher education in favour of the bumiputera.

The manufacturing sector is exempted from the Foreign Investment Committee (FIC) Guidelines and the mandatory 30% Bumiputera equity and restrictions in market entry have been removed for all (manufacturing) sub-sectors.

== National identification card system and bumiputera ==
Malaysia requires citizens to carry a national identification card called MyKad. Smart Cards identify citizens as Muslims or non-Muslims. The national identification card does not specify whether or not the holder is a bumiputera.

== See also ==
- Bumiputera (Brunei)
- Bumiputera (Indonesia)
- Ketuanan Melayu
- Social contract (Malaysia)
- Malayness
- Human rights in Malaysia
