= First Malayan Five-Year Plan =

Economic development plan of Malaysia

The First Malayan Five-Year Plan (1956 – 1960) was the first economic development plan launched by the Malayan government just before independence in 1957. The colonial British government had concentrated available resources on fighting the Malayan communist insurgency instead of developing the rural areas of Malaya. The Five Year Plan allocated substantial resources to agricultural and rural improvement, and was administrated by the Prime Minister's department. A total of 24% of all public expenditure alone was allocated by the Plan to develop agriculture in Malaya, and substantial sums were also made available for infrastructure development.

== Background ==
Prior to its formal independence, Malaya has long been investing itself for a long term plan for its economic development post independence. In 1956, one year before Malaya gained its formal independence from the British Empire, the First Malayan Plan was launched.
