= Article 153 of the Constitution of Malaysia =

Malaysian segregationist constitutional article

Parliament of Malaysia
- Long title: Reservation of quotas in respect of services, permits, etc., for Malays and natives of any of the States of Sabah and Sarawak
- Citation: Constitution of Malaysia, Article 153
- Territorial extent: Malaysia
- Enacted by: Reid Commission (drafting body)
- Enacted: 27 August 1957
- Commenced: 31 August 1957

Related legislation
- Article 160
- Status: In force

Article 153 of the Constitution of Malaysia grants the Yang di-Pertuan Agong (King of Malaysia) responsibility for "safeguard[ing] the special position of the Malays and natives of any of the States of Sabah and Sarawak and the legitimate interests of other communities" and goes on to specify ways to do this, such as establishing quotas for entry into the civil service, public scholarships and public education.

Article 153 is one of the most controversial articles in the Malaysian constitution. Critics consider Article 153 as creating an unnecessary distinction between Malaysians of different ethnic backgrounds, because it has led to the ethnocentric implementation of affirmative action policies which benefit only the Bumiputra, who comprise a majority of the population. Critics also consider the preferential treatment to be against both meritocracy and egalitarianism. Technically, questioning the matters prescribed in Article 153 may be deemed as a seditious tendency even in Parliament under Malaysian law, although it was originally drafted as a temporary provision to the Constitution. Despite this prohibition on discussion (in order to ostensibly manage race relations, thus appearing to defuse and avoid ethnic hatred, ethnic conflict and ethnic violence), the article is hotly debated, both privately and publicly among Malaysians, against the continued perpetual retention and implementation of the article although ostensibly maintaining support for the special race-based privileges. Nevertheless, the article is viewed as a sensitive matter by many, with politicians who are in favour or opposed to it often being labelled as racist and engaging in social exclusion.

The article can be seen as a continuation of previous laws made by the British to protect the indigenous peoples from being overwhelmed by the immigration of Chinese and Indian workers into Malaya. In the years after independence in 1957, the Chinese in particular were generally congregated in urban areas (towns and cities resulting from trade and mining) and possessed relatively greater incomes and wealth, whilst the Bumiputra were mostly living in rural areas with meagre incomes and little wealth, as they commonly engaged in subsistence agriculture and artisanal fishing.

== Origins ==
The Constitution was drafted on the basis of a report from the Reid Commission. The commission, which had been formed to lay the groundwork for a Constitution in the run-up to Malaysia's pending independence, released the report in 1957 as the Report of the Federation of Malaya Constitutional Commission 1957 or The Reid Commission Report. In the report, the Reid Commission stated that "provision should be made in the Constitution for the 'safeguarding of the special position of the Malays and the legitimate interests of the other Communities'." However, the Commission "found it difficult [...] to reconcile the terms of reference if the protection of the special position of the Malays signified the granting of special privileges, permanently, to one community only and not to the others."

The Reid Commission reported that Tunku Abdul Rahman and the Malay Rulers had asked that "in an independent Malaya all nationals should be accorded equal rights, privileges and opportunities and there must not be discrimination on grounds of race and creed." At that time, Tunku Abdul Rahman was the leader of the United Malays National Organisation (UMNO), which led the Alliance Party coalition. Eventually the Alliance would become the Barisan Nasional and Tunku Abdul Rahman later became the first Prime Minister of Malaysia. When succeeding to the UMNO Presidency, Tunku had expressed doubts about the loyalty of the non-Malays to Malaya, and as a result, insisted that this be settled before they be granted citizenship. However, he also stated that "For those who love and feel they owe undivided loyalty to this country, we will welcome them as Malayans. They must truly be Malayans, and they will have the same rights and privileges as the Malays."

The Commission found the existing privileges accorded to the Malays included the allocation of extensive Malay land reservations. In addition, the Commission discovered quotas for admission to the public services with a general rule that "not more than one-quarter of new entrants [to a particular service] should be non-Malays." Operation quotas existed in regard to the issuing of permits or licences for the operation of certain businesses "chiefly concerned with road haulage and passenger vehicles for hire." In addition, there were "scholarships, bursaries and other forms of aid for educational purpose" where preference was given to Malays.

Although the Commission reported it did not find opposition to the continuance of the existing privileges for a certain length of time, it stated that "there was great opposition in some quarters to any increase of the present preferences and to their being continued for any prolonged period." The Commission recommended that the existing privileges be continued as the "Malays would be at a serious and unfair disadvantage compared with other communities if they were suddenly withdrawn." However, "in due course the present preferences should be reduced and should ultimately cease." The Commission suggested that these provisions be revisited in 15 years, and that a report should be presented to the appropriate legislature (currently the Parliament of Malaysia) and that the "legislature should then determine either to retain or to reduce any quota or to discontinue it entirely."

Originally there was no reference made to other indigenous peoples of Malaysia (then Malaya) such as the Orang Asli, but with the union of Malaya with Singapore, Sabah and Sarawak in 1963, the Constitution was amended to provide similar privileges for the indigenous peoples of East Malaysia (Sabah and Sarawak), grouping them with the Malays as Bumiputra.

The 20-point agreement, or the 20-point memorandum, is a list of 20 points drawn up by North Borneo, proposing terms for its incorporation into the new federation as the state of Sabah, during negotiations prior to the formation of Malaysia. In the Malaysia Bill of the Malaysia Agreement some of the twenty points were incorporated, to varying degrees, into what became the Constitution of Malaysia; others were merely accepted orally, thus not gaining legal status. Point 12: Special position of indigenous races, in principle the indigenous races of North Borneo should enjoy special rights analogous to those enjoyed by Malays in Malaya, but the present Malaya formula in this regard is not necessarily applicable in North Borneo.

The scope of Article 153 is limited by Article 136, which requires that civil servants be treated impartially regardless of race.

== Controversy ==
Although the Bumiputra have always been the largest portion of Malaysia's population (about 65%), their economic position has also tended to be precarious. As late as 1970, 13 years after the drafting of the constitution, they controlled only 4% of the economy, with much of the rest being held by Chinese and foreign interests. As a result, the Reid Commission had recommended the drafting of Article 153 to address this economic imbalance.

But there continued to exist substantial political opposition to the economic reforms designed to aid the Malays. Some contended that Article 153 appeared to unduly privilege the Bumiputra as a higher class of Malaysian citizen. Many Chinese and Indians also felt unfairly treated since some of them had been there for generations – since the mid-19th century – and yet until the late 1950s, they had still not been granted Malaysian citizenship. However, a majority of the Malays during that time believed that the Chinese and the Indians came to Malaya for economic purposes only, working at plantations and mines.

In the 1970s, substantial economic reforms (Malaysian New Economic Policy) were enacted to address the economic imbalance. In the 1980s and 1990s, more affirmative action was also implemented to create a Malay class of entrepreneurs. Public opposition to such policies appeared to wither away after the 13 May incident, with parties running on a platform of reducing Bumiputra privileges losing ground in Parliamentary elections. However, in the first decade of the 21st century, debate was revived when several government politicians made controversial statements on the nature of Malay privileges as set out by Article 153.

=== Early debate ===
The article has been a source of controversy since the early days of Malaysia. In particular, it was not entirely clear if Article 153 was predicated on the Malays' economic status at the time, or if it was meant to recognise Bumiputra as a special class of citizens. Some took the latter view, like Singaporean politician Lee Kuan Yew of the People's Action Party (PAP), who publicly questioned the need for Article 153 in Parliament, and called for a "Malaysian Malaysia". In a speech, Lee said:

"According to history, Malays began to migrate to Malaysia in noticeable numbers only about 700 years ago. Of the 39% Malays in Malaysia today, about one-third are comparatively new immigrants like the secretary-general of UMNO, Dato' Syed Ja'afar Albar, who came to Malaya from Indonesia just before the war at the age of more than thirty. Therefore it is wrong and illogical for a particular racial group to think that they are more justified to be called Malaysians and that the others can become Malaysian only through their favour."

Lee also criticised the government's policies by stating that "[t]hey, the Malay, have the right as Malaysian citizens to go up to the level of training and education that the more competitive societies, the non-Malay society, has produced. That is what must be done, isn't it? Not to feed them with this obscurantist doctrine that all they have got to do is to get Malay rights for the few special Malays and their problem has been resolved." He also lamented "Malaysia—to whom does it belong? To Malaysians. But who are Malaysians? I hope I am, Mr Speaker, Sir. But sometimes, sitting in this chamber, I doubt whether I am allowed to be a Malaysian."

Lee's statements upset many, especially politicians from the Alliance. Finance Minister Tan Siew Sin called Lee the "greatest, disruptive force in the entire history of Malaysia and Malaya." Tunku Abdul Rahman considered Lee to be too extremist in his views, while other UMNO politicians thought Lee was simply taking advantage of the situation to pander to Chinese Malaysians. PAP-UMNO relations were chilled further when UMNO officials publicly backed the opposition Singapore Alliance Party in Singapore's 1963 general election and PAP responded in turn by fielding several candidates in the Malaysian federal elections in 1964. These acts were seen by each party as challenges of the other's authority in their respective domains, and in violation of previous agreements made by the PAP and UMNO not to contest each other's elections until Malaysia had matured enough. The tension led to the 1964 racial riots in Singapore that killed 36 people. Eventually, Tunku Abdul Rahman decided to ask Singapore, through Lee and some of his closest confidantes, to secede from Malaysia. Eventually, Lee (reluctantly) agreed to do so, and Singapore became an independent nation in 1965, with Lee as its first Prime Minister. The Constitution of Singapore contains an article, Article 152, that names the Malays as "indigenous people" of Singapore and requiring special safeguarding of their rights and privileges. However, the article specifies no policies for such safeguarding.

=== Racial rioting ===
On 13 May 1969, a few days after the 10 May general election, a race riot broke out. In the preceding election, parties like the Democratic Action Party (DAP, formerly the Malaysian branch of the PAP) and Parti Gerakan Rakyat Malaysia, which opposed special Bumiputra privileges, had made substantial gains, coming close to defeating the Alliance and forming a new government. The largely Chinese opposition Democratic Action Party and Gerakan later secured a police permit for a victory parade through a fixed route in Kuala Lumpur, the capital city of Malaysia. However, the rowdy procession deviated from its route and headed through the Malay district of Kampung Baru, jeering at the inhabitants. While the Gerakan party issued an apology the next day, UMNO announced a counter-procession starting from the Menteri Besar of Selangor, Harun Idris's house on Jalan Raja Muda. Reportedly, the gathering crowd was informed that Malays on their way to the procession had been attacked by Chinese in Setapak, several miles to the north. The angry protestors swiftly wreaked revenge by killing two passing Chinese motorcyclists, and the riot began. The official death toll was approximately 200, although some would later estimate it to be as high as 2,000. The riot was later attributed to the underlying discontent among Malays due to poverty.

UMNO Parliamentary backbencher Mahathir Mohamad soon became the face of a movement against Tunku Abdul Rahman, arguing that he had been too accommodative towards the non-Malays. In a letter to the Prime Minister, demanding his resignation, Mahathir argued that the Tunku had given the Chinese "too much face" and that the responsibility for the deaths of the people in the riot rested squarely on the Tunku Abdul Rahman's shoulders. Mahathir was expelled from UMNO not long after, and Home Affairs Minister Ismail Abdul Rahman warned that "[t]hese ultras believe in the wild and fantastic theory of absolute dominion by one race over the other communities, regardless of the Constitution".

The government suspended Parliament and the executive branch governed on its own through the National Operations Council (NOC) until 1971. The NOC proposed amendments to the Sedition Act that made the questioning of Article 153, among others illegal. These amendments were passed by Parliament as law when it reconvened in 1971.

During the period of NOC governance, the Malaysian New Economic Policy (NEP) was implemented. The NEP aimed to eradicate poverty irrespective of race by expanding the economic pie so that the Chinese share of the economy would not be reduced in absolute terms but only relatively. The aim was for the Malays to have a 30% equity share of the economy, as opposed to the 4% they held in 1970. Foreigners and Chinese held much of the rest. The NEP appeared to be derived from Article 153 and could be viewed as being in line with its wording. Although Article 153 would have been up for review in 1972, fifteen years after Malaysia's independence in 1957, due to the May 13 Incident it remained unreviewed. A new expiration date of 1991 for the NEP was set, twenty years after its implementation.

=== Additional affirmative action ===
Under the terms of the affirmative action policies implemented in line with Article 153, Bumiputra are given discounts on real estate.

Mahathir, who had been a strong supporter of affirmative action for the Malays since the late 1960s, expounded upon his views in his book The Malay Dilemma while in political exile. The book argued that stronger measures were needed to improve the Malays' economic position. It also contended that the Malays were the "definitive" people and thus "rightful owners" of Malaysia, which also entitled them to their privileges but he also criticized the Malays for being "easily forgetful". Mahathir was rehabilitated under the second prime minister, Tun Abdul Razak who became prime minister in 1981.

During Mahathir's tenure as prime minister, the NEP, after its expiry, was replaced by the National Development Policy (NDP), that sought to create a Malay class of entrepreneurs and business tycoons. However, allegations of corruption and nepotism plagued Mahathir's administration, and Mahathir's goal of creating a new class of Malay tycoons was criticised for ignoring the rural Malays, who comprised the majority of the Malay population. Under Mahathir, quotas for entry into public universities were enforced, with some universities such as Universiti Teknologi MARA (UiTM) admitting only Bumiputra students. In 1998, then Education Minister Najib Tun Razak (son of Tun Abdul Razak who implemented the NEP) stated that without quotas, only 5% of undergraduates in public universities would be Malays. Najib argued this justified the need for the continuation of quotas.

These policies also mandate that publicly listed companies must set aside 30% of equity for Bumiputra; discounts must be provided for automobile and real estate purchases; an amount must be set aside for Bumiputra in housing projects; companies submitting bids for government projects must be Bumiputra-owned and that Approved Permits (APs) for importing automobiles be preferentially given to Bumiputra. The equity in the publicly listed companies is disbursed by the Trade Ministry, and sold to selected Bumiputra at substantial discounts. However, the recipients frequently sell their stake in the companies immediately. The policies continued the Bumiputra advantage in higher education. In practice, however, most of these privileges went to Malays, and non-Malay Bumiputras, like the Orang Asli or aboriginal peoples, did not appear to have benefited much from Article 153 or policies such as the NEP.

=== Meritocracy ===
In 2003, Mahathir began stressing that Malays needed to abandon their "crutches," and implemented a policy of "meritocracy". However, this policy by and large streams Bumiputra into what is termed matriculation, as a prelude to university admission, whereby students take a course and later sit for a test set by the instructor. The non-Bumiputra generally sit for the Sijil Tinggi Pelajaran Malaysia (STPM) standardised examination to enter university. Although it is possible for non-Bumiputra to enter matriculation, and Bumiputra who prefer to take the STPM may do so, in practice, it is difficult for non-Bumiputra to gain entry into the matriculation stream.

The meritocracy policy itself was criticised from both sides of the political divide, with some parts of UMNO calling it "discrimination," leading to an "uneven playing field," and asked for the restoration of the quota system that set the ratio of Bumiputra to non-Bumiputra students in public institutions at 55 to 45. Others, however, branded meritocracy as a sham due to its division of students into the two different streams.

In 2003, Mahathir was succeeded by Abdullah Ahmad Badawi, who, like his predecessor, warned the Malays against over-relying on their privileges. "A continuing reliance on crutches will further enfeeble [the nation], and we may eventually end up in wheelchairs." However, within UMNO, some, such as Education Minister Hishamuddin bin Hussein and UMNO Deputy Permanent Chairman Badruddin Amiruldin, appeared to disagree and in turn argued for the protection of Malay privileges.

In 2005, several Malays, led by Hishamuddin at the UMNO Annual General Meeting (AGM) argued that the 30% equity target of the NEP had yet to be met and called on the government to restore the NEP as the New National Agenda (NNA). At the 2004 AGM, Badruddin had warned that questioning Article 153 and "Malay rights" would be akin to stirring up a hornet's nest, and declared, "Let no one from the other races ever question the rights of Malays on this land." The year before, UMNO Youth Information Chief Azmi Daim had said, "In Malaysia, everybody knows that Malays are the masters of this land. We rule this country as provided for in the federal constitution. Any one who touches upon Malay affairs or criticizes Malays is [offending] our sensitivities."

At the 2005 AGM, Hishamuddin brandished a kris (a traditional Malay dagger), while warning the non-Bumiputra not to attack Malay rights and "ketuanan Melayu" (translated variously as Malay supremacy or dominance). His action was applauded by the UMNO delegates. Then Higher Education Minister Shafie Salleh also stated that he would ensure the amount of new Malay students admitted would always exceed the old quotas set, and that UiTM would remain an all-Bumiputra institution.

=== Present opposition ===
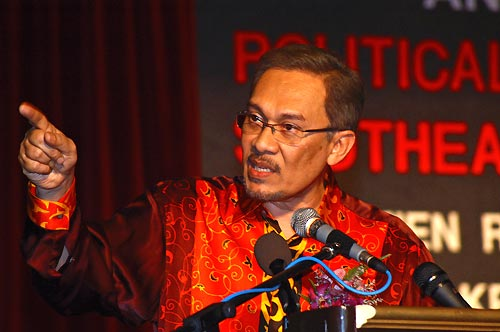
Anwar Ibrahim has been critical of the New Economic Policy since his release from prison.

At present, the Bumiputra privileges both enshrined in Article 153 and as set out by other acts of law, remain in force. Many opposition parties including, the DAP and the People's Justice Party (PKR), have pledged themselves to undoing the NEP. The DAP has argued that it does not have anything against the special position of Bumiputra as set out in Article 153, but seeks to undo the government's policies such as the NEP that they believe discriminate unfairly against the non-Bumiputras. The PKR, which was founded to fight for the release of former Deputy Prime Minister Anwar Ibrahim, who had been detained for charges of corruption and sodomy after he publicly opposed Mahathir's policies, also has criticised the NEP. After Anwar's release in 2004, he criticised the NEP as having failed the Malays and stated that he would seek its replacement by a more equitable policy.

The NEP and other privileges accorded to the Bumiputra under Article 153 have been noted for not explicitly seeking to eradicate poverty among the Malays, but instead largely aiming to improve the Malays' overall share of the economy, even if this share is held by a small number of Malays. However, the NEP has also been defended as having been largely successful in creating a Malay middle class and improving Malaysian standards of living without compromising the non-Bumiputra share of the economy in absolute terms; indeed, statistics indicate that the Chinese and Indian middle classes also grew under the NEP, albeit not as much as the Malays'. It has also been contended that the NEP defused racial tensions by eradicating the perception of the Chinese as the mercantile class and the perception of the Malays as farmers.

Article 10 (4) of the Constitution permits Parliament to make it illegal to question, among others, Article 153 of the Constitution. Under the Sedition Act, questioning Article 153 is illegal—even for Members of Parliament, who usually have the freedom to discuss anything without fear of external censure. The government can also arbitrarily detain anyone it desires theoretically for sixty days, but in reality for an undetermined length of time, under the Internal Security Act (ISA). In 1987 under Operation Lalang (literally "weeding operation"), several leaders of the DAP, including Lim Kit Siang and Karpal Singh, were held under the ISA. It is widely believed this was due to their calling for the NEP and other Malay privileges to be reviewed. Others have questioned the constitutionality of the NEP.

In 2005, the issue of the Constitution and its provisions was also brought up by several politicians within the government itself. Lim Keng Yaik of the Gerakan party, which by now had joined the Barisan Nasional, the ruling coalition, asked for a re-examination of the social contract so that a Bangsa Malaysia (literally 'Malaysian race' or 'Malaysian nation' in the Malay language) could be achieved. The social contract is the Constitution's provisions with regard to the different races' privileges—those who defend it and Article 153 often define the social contract as providing the Indians and Chinese with citizenship in exchange for the Malays' special rights or ketuanan Melayu.

Lim was severely criticised by many Malay politicians, including Khairy Jamaluddin, the Prime Minister's son-in-law and Deputy Chairman of the UMNO Youth wing, and Ahmad Shabery Cheek, a prominent Malay Member of Parliament from the state of Terengganu. The Malay press, most of which is owned by UMNO, also ran articles condemning the questioning of the social contract. Lim was adamant, asking in an interview "How do you expect non-Malays to pour their hearts and souls into the country, and to one day die for it if you keep harping on this? Flag-waving and singing the 'Negaraku' (the national anthem) are rituals, while true love for the nation lies in the heart."

A year earlier, Abdullah had given a speech where he mentioned the most "significant aspect" of the social contract as "the agreement by the indigenous peoples to grant citizenship to the immigrant Chinese and Indians". Although Abdullah went on to state that the character of the nation changed to "one that Chinese and Indian citizens could also call their own," the speech went largely unremarked.

In the end, Lim stated that the Malay press had blown his comments out of proportion and misquoted him. The issue ended with UMNO Youth chief Hishamuddin Hussein warning people not to "bring up the issue again as it has been agreed upon, appreciated, understood and endorsed by the Constitution."

== Article 153 in Diagrams ==
The two diagrams below summarise the provisions of Article 153. The first shows how Article 153 deals with the special position of Malays and the natives of Sabah and Sarawak (collectively, "bumiputras") and the second shows how it deals with the legitimate interests of the other communities.

Diagram 1: Special Position of Bumiputras

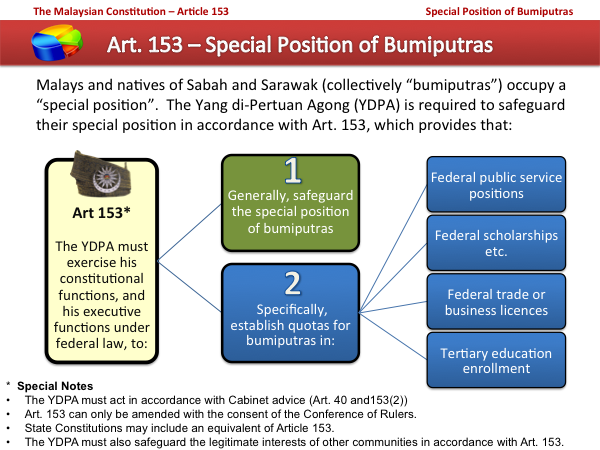

Diagram 2: Legitimate Interests of Other Communities

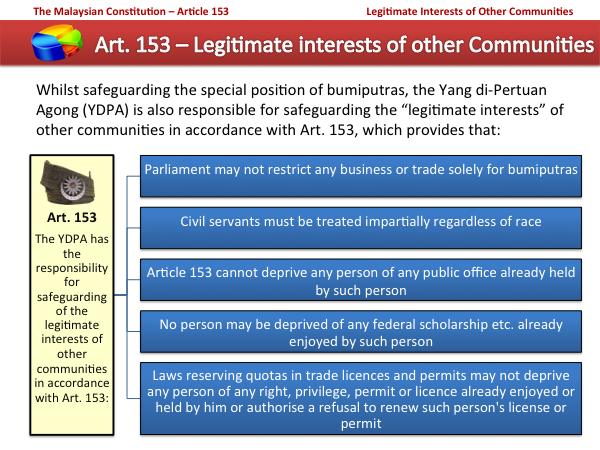

== Full text of Article 153 ==
1. It shall be the responsibility of the Yang di-Pertuan Agong to safeguard the special position of the Malays and natives of any of the States of Sabah and Sarawak and the legitimate interests of other communities in accordance with the provisions of this Article.
2. Notwithstanding anything in this Constitution, but subject to the provisions of Article 40 and of this Article, the Yang di-Pertuan Agong shall exercise his functions under this Constitution and federal law in such manner as may be necessary to safeguard the special provision of the Malays and natives of any of the States of Sabah and Sarawak and to ensure the reservation for Malays and natives of any of the States of Sabah and Sarawak of such proportion as he may deem reasonable of positions in the public service (other than the public service of a State) and of scholarships, exhibitions and other similar educational or training privileges or special facilities given or accorded by the Federal Government and, when any permit or licence for the operation of any trade or business is required by federal law, then, subject to the provisions of that law and this Article, of such permits and licences.
3. The Yang di-Pertuan Agong may, to ensure in accordance with Clause (2) the reservation to Malays and natives of any of the States of Sabah and Sarawak of positions in the public service and of scholarships, exhibitions and other educational or training privileges or special facilities, give such general directions as may be required for that purpose to any Commission to which Part X applies or to any authority charged with responsibility for the grant of such scholarships, exhibitions or other educational or training privileges or special facilities; and the Commission or authority shall duly comply with the directions.
4. In exercising his functions under this Constitution and federal law in accordance with Clauses (1) to (3) the Yang di-Pertuan Agong shall not deprive any person of any public office held by him or of the continuance of any scholarship, exhibition or other educational or training privileges or special facilities enjoyed by him.
5. This Article does not derogate from the provisions of Article 136.
6. Where by existing federal law a permit or licence is required for the operation of any trade or business the Yang di-Pertuan Agong may exercise his functions under that law in such manner, or give such general directions to any authority charged under that law with the grant of such permits or licences, as may be required to ensure the reservation of such proportion of such permits or licences for Malays and natives of any of the States of Sabah and Sarawak as the Yang di-Pertuan Agong may deem reasonable, and the authority shall duly comply with the directions.
7. Nothing in this Article shall operate to deprive or authorise the deprivation of any person of any right, privilege, permit or licence accrued to or enjoyed or held by him or to authorised a refusal to renew to any person any such permit or licence or a refusal to grant to the heirs, successors or assigns of a person any permit or licence when the renewal or grant might reasonably be expected in the ordinary course of events.
8. Notwithstanding anything in this Constitution, where by any federal law any permit or licence is required for the operation of any trade or business, that law may provide for the reservation of a proportion of such permits or licences for Malays and natives of any of the States of Sabah and Sarawak; but no such law shall for the purpose of ensuring such a reservation-
  - (a) deprive or authorise the deprivation of any person of any right, privilege, permit or licence accrued to or enjoyed or held by him;
  - (b) authorise a refusal to renew to any person any such permit or licence or a refusal to grant to the heirs, successors or assigns of any person any permit or licence when the renewal or grant might in accordance with the other provisions of the law reasonably be expected in the ordinary course of events, or prevent any person from transferring together with his business any transferable licence to operate that business; or
  - (c) where no permit or licence was previously required for the operation of the trade or business, authorise a refusal to grant a permit or licence to any person for the operation of any trade or business which immediately before the coming into force of the law he had been bona fide carrying on, or authorise a refusal subsequently to renew to any such person any permit or licence, or a refusal to grant to the heirs, successors or assigns of any such person any such permit or licence when the renewal or grant might in accordance with the other provisions of that law reasonably be expected in the ordinary course of events.
  1. (8A) Notwithstanding anything in this Constitution, where in any University, College and other educational institution providing education after Malaysian Certificate of Education or its equivalent, the number of places offered by the authority responsible for the management of the University, College or such educational institution to candidates for any course of study is less than the number of candidates qualified for such places, it shall be lawful for the Yang di-Pertuan Agong by virtue of this Article to give such directions to the authority as may be required to ensure the reservation of such proportion of such places for Malays and natives of any of the States of Sabah and Sarawak as the Yang di-Pertuan Agong may deem reasonable, and the authority shall duly comply with the directions.
9. Nothing in this Article shall empower Parliament to restrict business or trade solely for the purpose of reservations for Malays and natives of any of the States of Sabah and Sarawak.
  1. (9A) In this Article the expression "natives" in relation to the State of Sabah or Sarawak shall have the meaning assigned to it in Article 161A.
10. The Constitution of the State of any Ruler may make provision corresponding (with the necessary modifications) to the provisions of this Article.
