= National Development Policy =

Malaysian economic policy

The National Development Policy (NDP; Malay: Dasar Pembangunan Nasional) was a Malaysian socioeconomic development policy introduced in 1991 under Prime Minister Mahathir Mohamad. It succeeded the New Economic Policy (NEP), which had guided national development from 1970 to 1990. The NDP retained the NEP's principal objectives of poverty eradication and restructuring society to reduce economic imbalances between ethnic groups, while placing greater emphasis on economic growth, private-sector participation and human resource development.

The policy was implemented through the Second Outline Perspective Plan (1991–2000), which sought to balance economic growth with a more equitable distribution of its benefits. Its strategies included reducing hardcore poverty, developing a Bumiputera Commercial and Industrial Community (BCIC), encouraging private-sector participation in economic restructuring and improving human resource development. The NDP was succeeded by the National Vision Policy in 2001.

== Background ==
The NDP followed the implementation of the NEP, which was introduced in 1970 following the 13 May incident. The NEP sought to promote national unity through two principal objectives: eradicating poverty irrespective of race and restructuring society to reduce the identification of ethnicity with economic function. These objectives were pursued through economic development programmes, rural development, employment opportunities and the expansion of Bumiputera participation in the modern sectors of the economy.

The NEP was implemented through the First Outline Perspective Plan (1971–1990), which encompassed four five-year Malaysia Plans. Although the policy contributed to economic growth and improvements in income distribution, some of its targets remained unfulfilled by the end of the period. In particular, Bumiputera ownership of corporate equity reached 20.3% in 1990, below the target of 30%. The government also identified continuing socioeconomic imbalances that required further attention.

Following the conclusion of the First Outline Perspective Plan in 1990, the government formulated the Second Outline Perspective Plan (1991–2000), based on the NDP. The new policy was intended to build upon the achievements of the NEP while adjusting its strategies to address remaining socioeconomic disparities. The government also considered proposals from various groups, including the National Economic Consultative Council, during the formulation of the post-1990 development framework.

== Objectives and strategies ==
The NDP retained the principle of growth with equity, with national unity remaining its overarching objective. It sought to promote a more balanced distribution of economic opportunities and benefits while maintaining sustained economic growth. The policy also emphasised the development of a competitive and modern industrial economy.

The Second Outline Perspective Plan identified several important strategies for achieving these objectives:

- Poverty eradication: The anti-poverty strategy shifted towards eradicating hardcore poverty while continuing efforts to reduce relative poverty. Greater attention was given to improving employment opportunities, productivity and access to basic services.
- Bumiputera participation: The government sought to increase Bumiputera participation in the modern sectors of the economy through employment opportunities and the development of an active Bumiputera Commercial and Industrial Community (BCIC). The emphasis was placed on developing entrepreneurial, managerial and business capabilities.
- Private-sector participation: The private sector was expected to assume a greater role in economic restructuring by providing opportunities for business development and investment. This approach was intended to encourage economic growth while expanding participation in commercial and industrial activities.
- Human resource development: Greater emphasis was placed on education, vocational training and the development of professional, technical and managerial skills to improve productivity and support industrialisation.
- Balanced regional development: The policy sought to reduce economic disparities between states and between urban and rural areas, while improving the distribution of development opportunities throughout the country.
- Science and technology: The government aimed to strengthen technological capabilities and incorporate science and technology into socioeconomic planning to support the development of a modern industrial economy.

== Implementation ==
The NDP was implemented through the Second Outline Perspective Plan, covering the period from 1991 to 2000. Its first five-year phase was carried out through the Sixth Malaysia Plan (1991–1995), followed by the Seventh Malaysia Plan (1996–2000). These development plans translated the policy's broad objectives into government programmes, expenditure priorities and development projects.

One of the policy's principal initiatives was the development of the BCIC. The government supported Bumiputera participation in commercial and industrial activities through business opportunities, contracts, licences, financial assistance and government-linked institutions. Agencies such as Majlis Amanah Rakyat (MARA), Permodalan Nasional Berhad (PNB) and Perbadanan Nasional Berhad (PERNAS) played roles in supporting Bumiputera entrepreneurship and business development.

In contrast with the earlier emphasis on achieving specific numerical targets for corporate equity ownership, the NDP placed greater attention on developing the capabilities of Bumiputera entrepreneurs to establish, manage and operate businesses. The government nevertheless continued efforts to increase Bumiputera equity ownership. The Second Outline Perspective Plan did not establish a specific deadline for achieving the 30% equity ownership target, although progress towards it was to be reviewed by 2000.

The policy also encouraged greater private-sector participation in economic restructuring. The government sought to create a more conducive environment for private investment, improve industrial productivity and expand employment opportunities. Human resource development, including education and skills training, was considered essential to increasing the participation of Malaysians in higher-skilled occupations and modern industries.

== Economic and social outcomes ==
The implementation of the NDP took place during a period of substantial economic growth and industrial development in Malaysia. The policy continued the government's efforts to reduce poverty and improve income distribution, while expanding Bumiputera participation in the modern economy.

A World Bank study examining Malaysia's development experience between 1970 and 2000 reported substantial reductions in poverty and income inequality alongside sustained economic growth. It also identified improvements in the economic participation of Bumiputera communities. However, the study assessed the combined development experience of the NEP and NDP periods rather than attributing these outcomes exclusively to the NDP.

The NDP also formed part of the broader development framework associated with Vision 2020, which aimed to transform Malaysia into a developed nation by 2020. Its emphasis on industrialisation, human resource development and economic competitiveness contributed to the government's longer-term development agenda.

== Criticism and debate ==
Despite its emphasis on balanced economic development, the NDP continued to rely on affirmative action measures favouring the Bumiputera community. The continuation of these policies remained a subject of debate concerning economic opportunities, resource distribution and the participation of other ethnic groups in the economy.

Political economist Hwok-Aun Lee has argued that the NDP retained the central framework of the NEP while adopting a more growth-oriented approach. Although the private sector was assigned a greater role and investment conditions were selectively liberalised, the policy continued to support Bumiputera economic development through preferential measures. Lee also noted that the policy's approach to economic restructuring and its implementation remained subjects of debate.

The development of Bumiputera corporate ownership and entrepreneurship also faced challenges. Although government initiatives increased Bumiputera participation in the economy, the distribution of corporate ownership and the development of independent business capabilities remained areas of concern. The distinction between nominal equity ownership and effective participation in business management was particularly relevant to assessments of the policy's achievements.

== Legacy ==
The NDP concluded in 2000 and was succeeded by the National Vision Policy (NVP), which covered the period from 2001 to 2010 under the Third Outline Perspective Plan. The NVP continued several elements of the earlier development policies while placing greater emphasis on building a more resilient and competitive economy, strengthening national unity and developing a knowledge-based society.
