= Malaysian New Economic Policy =

Anti-poverty strategy, 1971–1991

The New Economic Policy (NEP) (Malay: Dasar Ekonomi Baru (DEB)) was a social re-engineering and affirmative action program formulated by the National Operations Council (NOC) in the aftermath of the 13 May Incident in Malaysia. This policy was adopted in 1971 for a period of 20 years and it was succeeded by the National Development Policy (NDP) in 1991.

== Policy overview ==
The New Economic Policy (NEP) which began with the Second Malaysia Plan (1971–1975) and lasted until the Fifth Malaysia Plan (1986–1990), had three main objectives, namely:

- To achieve national unity, harmony and integrity
- Through socio-economic restructuring (of the society)
- To minimize the level of poverty in the country (poverty eradication)

The NEP was conceived as a two-pronged strategy for eradicating poverty for all Malaysians as well as reducing and subsequently eliminating identification of race by economic function and geographical location. The policy sought to achieve its objectives through rapid expansion of the economy over time and set its target of substantially reducing the incidence of absolute poverty by 1990. To achieve this, the policy called for aggressive improvement of economic status and quality of life for all Malaysians through:

- Access to land
- Physical capital
- Training
- Public facilities

Concurrently, the policy also called for fairer distribution of opportunities to participate in the widening range of economic activities. The policy opined that the core problem that stood in the way of national unity was the division of racial groups by economic function; particularly the association of Malay and other indigenous races with subsistence agriculture. To dissociate Malay and other indigenous races with traditional agriculture, the policy called on the Malaysian Government to provide assistance to all Malaysians in:

- Finding employment
- Securing participation in economic activities
- Acquiring ownership in various economic sectors

As Malay and other indigenous races progressed in the modern economic sector, other Malaysians were encouraged to introduce modern agriculture to eliminate the identification of Malay and other indigenous races with subsistence agriculture.

The overarching principle of the policy was the creation of "a socio-economic environment in which individual Malaysians find self-fulfilment within a system which provides for proportional participation, management and control in the economic life of the nation".

== Policy development context ==
=== Colonial period ===
During British colonial rule in Malaya, the Malays had always been in close contact with British officials by virtue of being the subjects of the Sultans. Administratively, Malays displayed a highly structured system, which enabled the British to embed themselves into the existing structure with ease. To communicate effectively with the Malay Rulers, Malays were employed by the British to work in Resident's Offices as clerical staff. However, Malays were mostly educated in Islamic madrasah, with little exposure to Western education. To ensure a competent administrative workforce, the British established Malay schools to teach to basic clerical knowledge.

The discovery of tin in Malaya in 1820s led to an influx of Chinese miners. This discovery led to disputes among the Malay Rulers, Chinese miners, affluent chieftains and villagers, resulting in formal British colonial rule in 1874. By 1885, Malaya became the largest tin producer in the world, accounting for 55% of global tin output. The prosperity brought about by tin mining was primarily shared between the British and the Chinese. As mining towns grew larger and became more economically important, urban infrastructure improved and these mining towns became the seat of administrative power for the British and traditional Malay capitals became insignificant.

In 1839, the vulcanisation technique was discovered by Charles Goodyear, which marked the beginning of the extensive use of rubber in industry. In Malaya, Henry Nicholas Ridley, Director of Singapore and Penang Botanical Gardens, introduced rubber plantations in the early 1890s when he convinced the Kinderly Brothers of Inch Kenneth Estate in Selangor and a Chinese tapioca planter, Tan Chay Yan in Malacca to adopt rubber plantations as a commercial enterprise. By 1911, labour imported from India involved in the rubber plantation sector totaled 126,665 people and Malaya became the world's largest producer of natural rubber. Educated Indians were employed in the estates' hospitals and clinics while the majority worked as rubber tappers.

=== Malaya's economy pre- and post-independence ===
Before independence in 1957, Malaya's economy was recovering from the destruction brought about by World War II, entailing huge reconstruction costs to the British colonisers. As the British sought to consolidate Malaya's economic policy between the Malay States, the Malayan Union was proposed to unify the Federated and Unfederated Malay States into a single entity. This proposal was met with objection from the Malay community as they were angered by the way in which the Malay Rulers' assent was sought. Furthermore, there were concerns about citizenship and economic policies if the proposed union were to materialise.

After a short period of union, the British dissolved the Malayan Union and replaced it with the Federation of Malaya, with Tunku Abdul Rahman as its first Chief Minister. By that time, rubber and tin were the main source of income for the federation and it was one of the more prosperous economies in the region. Its per capita income was ranked third in Asia, after Japan and Singapore.

British corporations dominated the lucrative rubber industry and large tracts of land were dominated by British corporations such as Dunlop Plantation, Guthrie Plantation and Harrisons & Crossfield. However, the British agricultural policy during that period discouraged the participation of indigenous communities in the export crop economy, despite interest in smallholding rubber plantations. This development left the indigenous population in subsistence agriculture producing largely for domestic production and consumption, while the British and other communities expanded their interest in commercial agricultural production and dominated the export crop economy.

After independence, the Federation of Malaya government pursued a diversification policy to promote other economic activities. The government also acknowledged that dependency on rubber and tin as the main contributors to the national income could not be immediately reduced. The poverty rate up to 1970 was high at 49%, with the indigenous communities holding less than 3% of the national economy.

=== Racial riots of 1969 ===
The racial riots of 1969 occurred against the backdrop of high poverty rates among the indigenous population and was compounded by communal political tension. Perceptions among the communities persisted and helped fuel mistrust, especially between the Malay and Chinese communities. At the more affluent neighbourhood of Petaling Jaya, it was evident that people with similar socioeconomic status were the least affected by the riots.

The precursor to the racial riots of 1969 occurred in Singapore in 1964, which led to the expulsion of Singapore from the Federation of Malaysia. The People's Action Party (PAP), Malaysia's main opposition party, called for equality for all Malaysians and challenged the domination of the ruling Alliance Party coalition in the federal election of 1964. This was known as the 'Malaysian Malaysia' campaign. As communal tension threatened to turn violent, the federal government decided to expel Singapore from the Federation of Malaysia.

=== Suspension of Parliament and formulation of the New Economic Policy ===
In the wake of the riots, the government declared a state of national emergency and Parliament was suspended. A caretaker government, the National Operations Council (NOC), was formed and chaired by Tun Abdul Razak. After restoring order and setting the constitutional framework, the New Economic Policy was announced in the Second Malaysia Plan. The socio-political justification for NEP was:

National Unity is unattainable without greater equity and balance among Malaysia's social and ethnic groups in their participation in the development of the country and in the sharing of the benefits from modernization and economic growth. National Unity cannot be fostered if vast sections of the population remain poor and if sufficient productive employment opportunities are not created for the expanding labour force

== Policy benchmarks ==
The NEP had the stated goal of poverty eradication and economic restructuring to eliminate the identification of ethnicity with economic function. The initial target was to move the ratio of economic ownership in Malaysia from a 2.4:33:63 ratio of Bumiputra, Other Malaysian, Foreigner ownership to a 30:40:30 ratio. This was to be done by redistributing the wealth to increase the ownership of enterprise by Bumiputra from a 2.4% to 30% of the share of national wealth. The 30% target for Bumiputra equity was proposed by Ismail Abdul Rahman after the government was unable to come to a consensus on an appropriate policy goal.

Alongside this redistribution of wealth was the goal of increased economic growth. This economic growth would allow the non-Bumiputra share of the economy to decrease, while permitting the growth of non-Bumiputra business interests in absolute terms. In some quarters, this was referred to as "expanding pie theory": the Bumiputra share of the pie would increase, without reducing the size of the non-Bumiputra slices of the pie. This theory was first enunciated in the Second Malaysia Plan.

In 1975 the government created incentives to expand large-scale manufacturing industries and energy-intensive industries, targeting these industries and building policies around them. The Heavy Industries Corporation of Malaysia (HICOM), for example, was formed to assist in the manufacture of pig-iron, aluminium die casting, pulp and paper, steel, cement, motorcycle and heavy engineering. At the same time, export incentives were initiated.

== Implementation ==
The abstract policies and goals of the NEP were implemented by the Second, Third, Fourth and Fifth Malaysia Plans.

Some specific requirements were introduced to achieve the 30% Bumiputra equity target set by the NEP. Among these was a requirement that all initial public offerings (IPOs) set aside a 30% share for Bumiputra investors. These investors could be selected by the company being listed on the stock exchange, or the Ministry of International Trade and Industry, which would normally recommend such state-owned trust agencies as Permodalan Nasional or the Armed Forces pension fund. These shares were initially heavily discounted, as IPO prices were often significantly lower than prices after the listing had taken place. However, this advantage has disappeared in recent years. Nevertheless, this regulation has been criticised, especially as the 30% target continues to apply after the IPO has occurred; if the Bumiputra investors divest their shares, the company must issue new shares to maintain the proportion of Bumiputra shares above 30%.

== Results ==
Wealth in the hands of the bumiputras went from 4% in 1970 to about 20% in 1997. The overall wealth of the country grew; per capita GNP went from RM1,142 in 1970 to RM12,102 in 1997. During the same period, absolute poverty in the population as a whole dropped from 50% to 6.8%. It is unclear what role the NEP played in these changes.

NEP Benchmarks over time
	1970	1990	2004	2011	2015
Bumiputra equity	2.4% (RM477m)	19.3% (RM20.9b)	18.7% (RM73.2b)	23.5%	16.2%
Overall poverty	52%	17.1%	5%		
Rural poverty	59%	21.8%	11%		
Household income	RM660	RM1,254	RM2,996		

The effects of the NEP on wealth distribution are disputed. The Gini index declined from 51.3 in 1970 to 44.6 in 1997, and 1987 figures indicated the mean income of the Malays had improved relative to both the Chinese and Indian communities. However, some have used 1997 statistics with 70.2 percent of households in the bottom 40 percent income group as Bumiputra, and 62.7 percent of households in the top 20 percent income bracket as non-Bumiputra, to argue that inequities remain. The Gini index also began to increase in the 1990s, going from 44.6 to 46.4 between 1990 and 1995; meanwhile, 1997 figures indicated that Chinese incomes were increasing at a rate double that of Malays'. Intra-ethnic income differences also increased markedly, especially among Malays.

Bumiputra participation in the professions and private sector increased as well, although Bumiputra remain somewhat under-represented. Between 1970 and 1990, the Bumiputra share of accountants doubled from 7 to 14 per cent, engineers from 7 to 35 per cent, doctors from 4 per cent to 28 per cent, and architects from 4 to 24 per cent. The Bumiputra portion of the share market – a figure frequently cited as "a measurement of overall community wealth", despite claims that it was misleading – increased from 2 to 20 per cent over the same period according to one academic's measurements. The Chinese share also increased from 37 to 46 per cent, at the expense of foreign participation. Official Kuala Lumpur Stock Exchange figures from 1998 were even more optimistic, indicating Bumiputra share ownership stood at 28.6% in 1990 and 36.7% in 1996.

The Chinese community in Malaysia accepted the NEP as a necessary evil to avoid Indonesian-style aggression, which the ruling party consistently instigate and deemed appropriate as their threat based policy. Furthermore, the Chinese community generally moved away from the public sector and set up businesses in the private sector, where the impact of the NEP was less pronounced.

In spite of the policies implemented under the NEP, the share of the national wealth owned by the non-Bumiputra races increased beyond the 40% mark. This figure, however, does not reflect that certain parts of the non-bumiputra population live in dire poverty. The Malaysian Indian and Orang Asli in particular form the lowest strata of the population in terms of economic ownership. The Orang Asli of Peninsular Malaysia are not considered Bumiputra under the Federal Constitution despite their indigenous status.

== Reimplementation ==
Officially the term of the NEP ended in 1990. However, much of it remained in effect through other governmental policies; the New Straits Times reported that this was because as of 2007, "the government believes the aim of having 30 per cent Bumiputera equity has yet to be achieved". In 2006, it was reported that the NEP would be reinstated under the Ninth Malaysia Plan, the ninth in a series of five-year economic plans. Originally, the NEP was replaced by the National Development Policy (NDP), which ran from 1990 to 2000. The NDP was supposed to have then been replaced by the National Vision Policy (NVP), which would reportedly have lessened the aggressive affirmative action of the NEP and NDP. However, UMNO later called for the NEP to be reinstated.

== Criticism ==
In recent years, the NEP has come under attack as being an inefficient system that promotes a laid-back attitude among the Bumiputra; it is racial-based and not deprivation based. Several policies of the NEP which give economic advantage to the rich Bumiputra, such as Bumiputra quotas in ownership of public company stock, and housing being sold exclusively to Bumiputra, are viewed as discriminatory.

Many of the NEP policies strive for equality of results rather than equality of opportunity, with NEP proponents justifying the concentration on results rather than opportunity as by pointing out that measuring equality of opportunity is difficult or impossible. When the NEP was implemented, for example, it was announced that one of its goals was to have 30% of all equity in Bumiputra hands.

NEP critics have argued that setting a target of 30% of Bumiputra trained and certified to run companies would represent a better equality in terms of opportunity. Still others suggest this target may not work as training and certification does not necessarily guarantee equality of opportunity. Tun Abdul Razak's predecessor as prime minister, Tunku Abdul Rahman, also opposed the 30% target, writing in the 1980s that "[a]n attempt was made to fill the target without thought for the ability and the capability of attaining it. ... Some became rich overnight while others became despicable Ali Babas and the country suffered economic setbacks".

The NEP is also criticised for not dealing directly with issues of wealth distribution and economic inequality; that it no longer helps the poor but is instead an institutionalised system of handouts for the largest ethnic community in Malaysia as the NEP does not discriminate based on economic class. Bumiputra of high and low economic standing are entitled to the same benefits. The statistical problems of categorising wealthy and disadvantaged Bumiputra in one group also meant that the NEP's goal of having 30% of the national wealth held by Bumiputra was not indicative of a median 60% of Bumiputra holding 28% of the national wealth, but could theoretically translate into one Bumiputra holding 29% of the national wealth, with the remaining Bumiputra sharing 1%. Some have alleged that because of this imbalance, some Malays remain economically marginalised. Criticisms also arose from the fact that there was no planned assistance for Malaysian Chinese and Indian communities to achieve their 40% goal during the actual implementation of the NEP.

The manufacturing sector is exempted from the Foreign Investment Committee (FIC) Guidelines, the 30 per cent Bumiputera equity and restrictions in market entry have been removed for all sub-sectors.

=== Education ===
The education policy of the NEP is one of the plan's more controversial points.

Bumiputra were accorded quotas for admission to public universities until 2002. These quotas were fixed, however, and in later years meant that the Bumiputra were allotted a significantly lower percentage of places originally intended, as the population figures used to calculate the quotas were based on 1970s numbers. Despite this, the quotas were still considered by many non-Bumiputra as unfairly rewarding the Bumiputra. The government removed these quotas in 2003.

The removal of the quotas has done little to remedy the perceptions of Bumiputra bias in the public tertiary education system. Most Bumiputra opt to enter a one-year matriculation programme, which is considered by some to be less intensive than the two-year Sijil Tinggi Persekolahan Malaysia (STPM) or Malaysian High Certificate of Education, which is equivalent to the British A-levels. Although the 'grade' standards required for admission are the same for both programmes, there is no moderation to ensure the difficulty of achieving a grade standard is the same between both programmes. The Malaysian High Certificate of Education (STPM) is open to all races, but the Matriculation programme has a 10% quota for non-Bumiputra (meaning that 90% of students admitted must be Bumiputra). In practice significantly more Bumiputra enter the matriculation program, even after normalising for ethnic demographics.

These differences predate the removal of hard quotas. The difference in academic routes in fact begins in secondary school. Many Bumiputra enter public boarding secondary schools (sekolah asrama) whereas most non-Bumiputra remain in normal public secondary schools. The exams taken are the same until form 5 but then most Bumiputra go on to matriculation, whereas non-Bumiputra do STPM. However, even Bumiputra who remain in 'normal' secondary schools usually do matriculation instead of STPM. The lack of public transparency in grading of the papers contributed to this criticism.

The removal of quotas was largely reported to have resulted in an increase in the percentage of Bumiputra entering public universities. The perceived bias towards Bumiputra has meant that non-Bumiputra who can afford to do so choose to enter private colleges or to go overseas to further their education. There is a significant proportion of non-Bumiputra who do not enter into contention for admission to public universities.

Critics argue that this policy of the NEP has also contributed to a brain drain. Others suggest that the NEP has contributed to racial polarisation and a feeling of marginalisation among the non-Malays.

However, as of 2007, Chinese Malaysians dominate the professions of accountants, architects and engineers while Indian Malaysians dominate the professions of veterinarians, doctors, lawyers and dentists well exceeding their respective population ratios compared to Bumiputra.

=== Changing mindsets ===
Some Bumiputra have spoken of reducing or eliminating the NEP; for example, Datuk Seri Abdullah Ahmad Badawi, Prime Minister of Malaysia, in his maiden speech as United Malays National Organisation (UMNO) president to the UMNO general assembly in 2004 stated "Let's not use the crutches for support all the time, the knee will become weak". Badawi went on to state that continued usage of crutches would eventually result in needing a wheelchair instead. As of October 2004, Badawi has not addressed any significant concerns about the NEP.

Not all Bumiputra political leaders shared Badawi's views. For example, Badruddin Amiruldin, who was elected as UMNO's Deputy Permanent chairman, waved a book about the 13 May incident at the assembly during his speech while declaring, "No other race has the right to question our privileges, our religion and our leader", continuing that any such action would be akin to "stirring up a hornet's nest". The following day, Dr. Pirdaus Ismail, a UMNO Youth Executive Committee member, stated, "Badruddin did not pose the question to all Chinese in the country. Those who are with us, who hold the same understanding as we do, were not our target. In defending Malay rights, we direct our voice at those who question them."

Agreement on the continued implementation (or reimplementation) is not always unanimous within the ruling Barisan Nasional coalition. In 2005, Khairy Jamaluddin, the UMNO deputy youth chief was debated by then MCA (the major Chinese component party of the ruling Barisan Nasional) vice-president Chua Jui Meng on a nationally televised debate – both leaders agreed to Chua's proposal to set up a national committee to review the NEP. However, as of 8 March 2008 general elections, this has yet to be implemented.

Because of the controversy over affirmative action policies in Malaysia, especially the NEP, it has been feared that the NEP may indirectly contribute to a decrease in foreign investment. In 2005, foreign investment fell by US$4 billion, or 14% which some commentators attributed to the controversy over the government's ethnic policies.

=== Equity calculation ===
The calculation of Bumiputra-held economic equity has been frequently disputed, with a number of allegations that the government intentionally underestimated the share of Bumiputra equity to justify the NEP and its related policies. Although many affirmative action measures of the NEP were continued under the National Development Policy which ran from 1990 to 2000, and later by the National Vision Policy set to run from 2000 to 2010 – leading many Malaysians to refer to the NEP in the present tense – the official Bumiputra equity share remained under the original 30% target.

In 2006, a major dispute arose when the Asian Strategic and Leadership Institute (ASLI) issued a report calculating Bumiputra-held equity at 45% – a stark difference from the official figure of 18.9%. The report's publication triggered a relatively vocal public debate about the status of the NEP and its related policies, with many from UMNO questioning the methodology used by ASLI. One strongly disputed issue was ASLI's decision to consider government-linked companies as Bumiputra-owned, inflating the calculated figure of Bumiputra equity. Although ASLI later withdrew the report, citing unspecified errors in its methodology, the debate did not die down. One political analyst suggested that "If Bumiputra equity is 45 per cent, then surely the next question is, why the need for Bumiputera rights? It has implications for government policy and it (removing indigenous rights) is one thing UMNO will never accept at present." Others have argued that the debate over inter-ethnic disparities has obscured intra-ethnic inequities, citing the increased Gini coefficient for Bumiputra (from 0.433 in 1999 to 0.452 in 2004), Chinese (0.434 to 0.446) and Indians (0.413 to 0.425).

A major point of dispute was the government's use of par value (as opposed to market value) of shares to calculate the equity held by Bumiputra. Many questioned the ASLI study on the basis that it had not used par value; conversely, others criticise the government for not using market value. On another note, some critics later noted that a 1997 University of Malaya study had calculated the Bumiputra share of equity to stand at 33.7%, using par value.

UMNO critics contend that the official figure does not take into account the huge volume of shares, amounting to 7.9 percent in 1999, that is held by nominee companies. Independent studies have revealed that politicians and political parties, including UMNO, have resorted to using nominee companies to conceal their ownership of corporate equity from public scrutiny. Also, branded conglomerates like Proton and Petronas are not regarded by the government as Bumiputra companies. This approach tends to exaggerate non-Malay purchasing power. It is also not clear if the government calculations included the 2.7 million unincorporated businesses in the country.

At the UMNO General Assembly that year, Education Minister and UMNO Youth Chief Hishamuddin Hussein quoted a local study indicating that at current rates, it would take the Malays "120 years to achieve income parity". He also cited a 2004 statistic indicating that for every RM 1 earned by a Malay, a Chinese earned RM 1.64 as evidence that the income gap had not been eliminated. The Deputy Youth Chief, Khairy Jamaluddin, proposed increasing the target "quota" if non-Malays continued to allege that the 30% target had been met, as "By any yardstick, the Malays are still left behind".

=== Brain drain ===
Many non-Malays (Chinese and Indians) have left Malaysia for other developed countries that do not practice policies that favor one race over the others in political, economical, and social contexts. This is believed to have led to the shortage of skilled workers, that directly caused the inability of Malaysia to pursue rapid economic development during the early 1960s until 1990s, during which the East Asian Tigers have done so.

== Recent developments ==
=== NEP for the southern Thailand Muslims ===
The chief minister of Malaysia's Kelantan State also PAS (Islamic Party of Malaysia) spiritual leader Nik Aziz said that Thailand should consider introducing an affirmative action policy like Malaysia's to narrow the social and economic gap between the Muslims and non-Muslims and to put a plug to the surging violence in southern Thailand.

The Thai government can emulate this theory because it can narrow the economic gap among the races

=== Polls ===
71% of Malaysians agree with the statement that Barisan Nasional's "race-based affirmative action policy is obsolete and must be replaced with a merit-based policy", the survey poll was conducted by the independent Merdeka Centre between 18 June 2008 and 29 July 2008, the result showed that up to 65 per cent of Malays who were asked the question agreed that race-based affirmative action should be done away, compared with 83 per cent of Chinese and 89 per cent of Indian respondents.

== See also ==
- Ali Baba (business)
- Buku Jingga
- Bumiputera (Malaysia)
- Economy of Malaysia
- Ketuanan Melayu
- New Economic Model
- Native Indonesians
- Black Economic Empowerment in South Africa

== Notes and references ==
=== Other references ===
- Bennet, Abang (30 October 2005). " UMNO: A threat to national prosperity". Malaysia Today.
- Goh, Cheng Teik (1994). Malaysia: Beyond Communal Politics. Pelanduk Publications. ISBN 967-978-475-4.
- Jeong Chun Hai @Ibrahim. (2007). Fundamental of Development Administration. Selangor: Scholar Press. ISBN 978-967-5-04508-0
- Musa, M. Bakri (1999). The Malay Dilemma Revisited. Merantau Publishers. ISBN 1-58348-367-5.
- Ye, Lin-Sheng (2003). The Chinese Dilemma. East West Publishing. ISBN 0-9751646-1-9.
- James Chin (2009) James Chin. The Malaysian Chinese Dilemma: The Never Ending Policy (NEP), Chinese Southern Diaspora Studies, Volume 3, 2009, pp. 167–182
- Durrishah Idrus (2003). New Economic Policy and the Birth of Malaysia's Own Industrial Relations System. Jurnal Kemanusiaan ISSN 1675-1930.
- Just Faaland, Mukhriz Mahathir and Khairy Jamaluddin (2003). Malaysia's new economic policy: An overview. Utusan Publications & Distributors Sdn Bhd.
- James Chin (2021) Affirmative Action at 50 in Malaysia A brief history and evaluation of the NEP, the never-ending policy, Tablet, 25 May
