= Malaysian lock-up detainee abuse scandal =

Human rights abuse scandal in Malaysia

The Malaysian lock-up detainee abuse scandal (also known as Squatgate) is a scandal involving the abuse allegations of detainees (initially Chinese citizens) under the care of the Royal Malaysian Police (Malay: Polis Diraja Malaysia, or PDRM) which occurred in 2005.

The scandal began with complaints from two Chinese female citizens about being stripped, having their breasts groped, and being forced to do squats (this has been described as 'ear squats' in most reports, meaning they were touching their ears as they did squats). Member of Parliament (MP) Teresa Kok of the Democratic Action Party accompanied one of them to lodge a police report. Later that month, Kok was given a video compact disc (VCD) by an anonymous whistle-blower that contained a video depicting a female police officer ordering a female detainee, now identified as Hemy Hamisa Abu Hassan Saari, do ear squats in the nude. Kok later showed the video to some other MPs, triggering shock and outrage.

Prime Minister Abdullah Ahmad Badawi insisted that there would be no cover-up. Initially the federal Deputy Inspector General, Musa Hassan, made remarks to a similar effect, but also defended the ear squats as "standard procedure". He later stated, "It is the perpetrator behind the video clip whom we are after and not the policewoman, who was carrying out a routine check." His comments led the leaders of all three opposition parties and an MP from the ruling Barisan Nasional coalition to call for Musa's resignation or dismissal. Deputy Internal Security Minister Noh Omar also stirred up controversy when he told foreigners upset about the scandal to "go home". He later made an apology, saying that he was misunderstood. However, a recording of his remarks indicated that he was not misquoted or taken out of context. An independent commission was later set up under Abdullah's orders to investigate the scandal.

== Early accusations ==
The first indications of abuse came in early November, when a Chinese housewife, Yu Xuezhen, went public with the story of her alleged abuse. According to her, she was travelling in a car with another Chinese national on 3 November when they were detained at a police roadblock because their passports were allegedly invalid. The policeman then demanded a RM500 bribe from them. The housewife later said, "Since both of us were carrying valid passports, we refused to give the policeman anything. We were then taken to the police station." She claimed that at the police station, a policewoman took RM50 from her purse and divided it among four police officers.

Then during a body search there, she was instructed to strip and that "A policewoman grabbed my breast and slapped me when I blushed. I was then forced to take off my undergarments and do five ear squats." She also alleged that a policeman peeped into the room through an open door, and that the door was only shut tight when she screamed.

When her husband later arrived with their marriage certificate, the police officer at the station refused to accept it as genuine. The women were released four days later after the Immigration Department confirmed their passports were real. The woman lodged a complaint with the police the next day, but insisted on anonymity.

In another unrelated case, a remisier with a wife from China was asked for a bribe by a police officer so that the process of confirming her passport could be sped up.

== Abuse video ==
On 25 November, the existence of the video recording of a female detainee, apparently of Chinese ethnicity, being forced to do ear squats in the nude was made public. As the woman turned to face the camera, one of her nipples was visible. The poor quality of the clip indicated it had been recorded by a mobile phone. Well-known Malaysian blogger Jeff Ooi immediately compared the scandal to the Abu Ghraib scandal in Iraq where United States military personnel forced prisoners to strip and abused them.

The video clip with the name gadis lokap (lady in custody, literally 'lock-up girl' in Malay) was distributed among the public in the form of a Multimedia Messaging System (MMS) clip. Initially some thought the clip to have been faked in an attempt to shame the police force, but the clip was later confirmed to have been filmed at the police headquarters in Petaling Jaya, Selangor. The Malay officer, identified as a constable, was identified and had her version of the events recorded by the police. On 29 November 2005, it was reported in the local newspapers that the woman is a Malaysian who was detained during a drug raid at a nightspot, and who was later charged in court over a drug-related offence. On 13 December 2005, the woman, identified as a 22-year-old Malay who was three-months pregnant, testified before the Commission of Inquiry probing the incident.

In November 2006, a Washington Post front-page article reporting on the case identified the woman as Hemy Hamisa Abu Hassan Saari, a 23-year-old Malaysian babysitter.

== Response ==
After the first reports of abuse broke, the Prime Minister ordered Home Minister Azmi Khalid to travel to China to improve Malaysia's image there. Reportedly, the number of Chinese tourists had been dropping over the past few months, and it was feared the abuse scandal would further exacerbate the situation. It was later revealed that the Cabinet directed Azmi to go on the trip before the scandal blew open.

When the video clip broke, the Prime Minister immediately insisted that "There should be no cover-up at all," while his Deputy stated "It should not have happened." Azmi also declared, "If police personnel are really involved, then this is police abuse." Lim Keng Yaik, a Minister and the leader of the Gerakan party, called for the establishment of a Police Complaint and Misconduct Commission. Abdullah later announced an independent body would be set up to investigate the scandal.

=== Defense of the police ===
Deputy Inspector General of the Police (IGP) Musa Hassan also initially promised that the perpetrators would be punished, but later stated "It is the perpetrator behind the video clip whom we are after and not the policewoman, who was carrying out a routine check," and that whoever filmed it would be charged under the Penal Code with insulting the woman's modesty, which carries a maximum sentence of five years in jail. Musa also stated that such actions are standard fare and are used to examine body cavities for possible contraband. The police began their investigation by quizzing staff of the China Press, which had also independently obtained footage of the incident. They also attempted to determine the identity of the detainee by blowing up some stills from the video and having them distributed to prisons and immigration detention centres. Azmi promised that the woman would be protected if she came forth to provide evidence, whatever her legal status.

The New Sunday Times confirmed Musa's claim that strip searches were standard police procedure carried out after being arrested. The squats were used to dislodge objects possibly concealed in body orifices, and in some cases, detainees were hosed with strong jets of water to dislodge material hidden in their hair. The New Sunday Times also reported that only officers of the same sex as the detainee were permitted to examine him or her and that officers of the opposite sex would not be allowed in the room where the examination was going on. However, Deputy Prime Minister Najib Tun Razak had earlier denied that strip searches were part of standard police procedure and that "There is no reason to embarrass and humiliate people in that manner." The British Broadcasting Corporation (BBC) was told by doctors that performing ear squats was an inefficient means of examination and could not dislodge anything hidden in the vagina or rectum. The leaders of three opposition parties – the DAP, PAS and Parti Keadilan Rakyat (PKR) – immediately called for Musa's dismissal.

The next day, the weekday edition of the newspaper, the New Straits Times, reported that although such procedures were permitted by the standard operating procedures of the police, the Lock-up Rules 1953 did not permit a body cavity search nor ear squats for any purpose. This would thereby make it illegal for the police to employ such procedures after making an arrest.

=== Controversial comment by Cabinet member ===
The same day, Deputy Internal Security Minister Noh Omar told the press "I dare say everything was done following the rules. ... If the law does not provide for it, ask the lawyers to sue the Government and summon the police." He promised to elaborate at Parliament the following day, but as Speaker of the Dewan Rakyat Ramli Ngah Taib did not permit discussion of the incident, he was unable to. However, he did tell the press "If the orang asing (foreigners) think we are zalim (cruel), ask them to go back to their own country." Most media outlets, many of which are owned by political parties in the governing Barisan Nasional coalition, did not report these comments after being reportedly told not to by the Prime Minister's office, but the comments received coverage in the evening edition of some local newspapers and many foreign ones.

The Chinese embassy requested Malaysia probe the assault cases further. Later, Noh made what the BBC described as a "grudging" apology; he stated "What I meant was Malaysia is a safe country. If foreigners think our police are cruel and the country is not safe, then they would have gone back home long time ago. I did not tell them to go back." The BBC also construed his comments as "a direct challenge" to the Prime Minister. Reportedly, Abdullah reprimanded Noh, who at first denied he had told anyone to "go back".

=== Azmi's China visit ===
In December, Azmi Khalid visited China as had been planned. Azmi expressed sadness about the incident, but did not apologise, and called the squats standard procedure. Azmi was in China to investigate the root causes of the drop in the number of Chinese visitors to Malaysia. Some of his aides stated that it appeared to be due to concern over the tsunami triggered by the 2004 Indian Ocean earthquake and the opening of other travel destinations.

=== Parliamentary backlash ===
After it was revealed that the gadis lokap was a Malay, several Senators, or members of the Dewan Negara (the upper house of Parliament), asked that Kok and Opposition Leader Lim Kit Siang be referred to the Parliamentary Committee of Privileges for "causing confusion" and making groundless accusations based on allegedly misleading information. It was also contended that Kok's showing of the video clip had shamed the woman's modesty. Some also said that Azmi's China visit was for nothing, as the gadis lokap was a Malay, and argued that Lim and Kok deserved to be punished for causing an unnecessary trip. However, Deputy Internal Security Minister Chia Kwang Chye insisted that Azmi's visit was not to apologise for the video clip in question.

Earlier, some had accused Kok of breaking the law pertaining to the display of pornographic material, which could lead to imprisonment. However, Minister in the Prime Minister's Department Nazri Aziz insisted that Kok's actions were not in violation of the law.

=== Detainee's race ===
Initially it was thought that the detainee filmed doing ear squats in the nude was a Chinese national. However, it was later revealed that she was in fact a Malay citizen of Malaysia. Noh, too, denied that he knew of the detainee's race or nationality until it was made public. Some opposition bloggers (including Lim) and independent journalists postulated that this information had been hidden to avoid giving the opposition party PAS ammunition for its campaign in the Pengkalan Pasir by-election that was eventually won by Barisan Nasional, which currently controls the federal government.

Later Abdullah stated that if the police had revealed the woman's race or nationality, they would have been accused of trying to cover up the scandal, and that nobody would have believed them. Kok told media, however, that many of her constituents appeared to also disbelieve that the woman was in fact a Malay, and asked her about it. At the end of 2005, two editors at the China Press, which had initially identified the woman as a Chinese national, resigned over the issue.

=== Other organisations ===
The Parliamentary Human Rights Caucus, led by Minister in the Prime Minister's Department Nazri Aziz, also condemned the abuse of the prisoner, with Nazri saying he was "disgusted" by the incident. Human rights non-governmental organisations (NGOs) expressed concern about the reported incidents of abuse but noted that such incidents were not uncommon. One spokesperson for Suaram said "One of the most common-place police abuses is to harass women by getting them to undress. This isn't something totally strange or alien that people can't associate with the Malaysian police." Another said, "In the past those leaders have condoned these sorts of attitudes as the norm – naturally the rest of the population think it's OK."

The Royal Commission on the Police that released its report earlier in 2005 also noted incidents of ear squats in the nude were common police procedure, despite being a breach of regulations. The commission recommended a code of practice that would not permit these cases to be included as part of the Standing Orders of the Inspector-General of Police.

Raja Petra Kamaruddin, a member of the Selangor Royal Family and a prominent member of the opposition, lambasted the government for only noticing such abuses now. He claimed he and his wife had both been stripped and hit by police personnel when they were detained, and called it "accepted practice in Malaysian lockups." Raja Petra argued that the government was only bothering to take action because the economy, which is reliant on tourism, would be impacted by the reports of abuse.

On 28 November a Malaysian woman, Norazimah Nor came to the Parliament lobby to notify the members that she and 8 other women were forced to strip and do 100 naked push-ups in the Kapar police lock-up on 5 November 2000. Media organisations sympathetic to Malaysian opposition parties as well as independent media like Malaysiakini cited her case as a reason to suspect the government's interest in the Chinese abuse cases was due more to tourist money instead of concern over human rights. Norazimah had been detained for attending an assembly organised by the opposition Barisan Alternatif.

=== Independent commission ===
On 2 December, it was announced that a five-member independent commission had been set up to investigate the incidents of alleged abuse. Former Chief Justice of Malaysia Tun Mohamed Dzaiddin Abdullah was named as the commission head; he had earlier served in the same capacity in the Royal Commission on the Police Force. The other members of the commission were Lim Ah Lek, Kamilia Ibrahim, former chairman of the Bar Council Kuthubul Zaman Bukhari and Hamzah Mohammad Rus, who would serve as the commission secretary. All of them had also served in the Royal Commission.

Their goals were to determine if the woman in the clip was one of five Chinese nationals who had filed complaints about police abuse, probe the procedure of body search shown, determine if there was any impropriety in the manner the search was conducted, investigate the police Standard Operating Procedures (SOPs) and the regulations concerning body searches, and recommend amendments or alterations to these rules. Abdullah gave the commission 30 days to prepare its report.

== See also ==
- Baldgate

== References and notes ==
=== Other references ===
- Abas, Azura (26 November 2005). "For closer co-operation". New Straits Times, p. 2.
- Abu Bakar, Zubaidah (26 November 2005). "Naked anger over lockup abuse". New Straits Times, pp. 1, 6.
- Charles, Lourdes (27 November 2005). "Police to go after person who filmed naked woman". The Star.
- "China asks Malaysia to probe assault cases". (29 November 2005). Xinhua.
- Chua, Eddie (2 December 2005). "Commission given 30 days to probe nude ear-squat video scandal". The Sun.
- "Commission had highlighted ear squats". (27 November 2005). New Sunday Times, p. 3.
- Cruez, Annie Freeda (27 November 2005). "'Only medical staff can carry out such checks'". New Sunday Times, p. 3.
- Damis, Aniza (28 November 2005). "Strip search – it's not legal". New Straits Times, p. 1, 6.
- Emmanuel, Tony (27 November 2005). "Nude video clip probe". New Sunday Times, pp. 1, 3.
- Gill, Parveen (12 November 2005). "Police made me strip, says Chinese national". The Star.
- Kent, Jonathan (25 November 2005). "Video puts Malaysia police in dock". BBC News.
- Kent, Jonathan (27 November 2005). "Pressure on Malaysia police chief". BBC News.
- Kent, Jonathan (30 November 2005). "Malaysia minister defends police". BBC News.
- Kent, Jonathan (30 November 2005). "Malaysia police minister 'sorry'". BBC News.
- Lim, Kit Siang (2005). "Press freedom interference – dangerous precedent in Pak Lah era". Retrieved 1 December 2005.
- Lim, Kit Siang (2005). "Who will back down – PM and DPM or Deputy IGP?". Retrieved 28 November 2005.
- "Malaysia investigates abuse claim". (26 November 2005). BBC News.
- "Malaysia yet to apologise for abuse". AFP.
- "Nude squat woman identified". (13 December 2005). The Star.
- Ooi, Jeff (2005). "Noh 'kena bambu' for 'lying' to PM". Retrieved 1 December 2005.
- Ooi, Jeff (2005). "Noh Omar censured for shooing at foreigners?". Retrieved 30 November 2005.
- "PM orders independent inquiry". (29 November 2005). New Straits Times, p. 1, 6.
- "Protests after motion denied". (30 November 2005). New Straits Times, p. 4.
- Sonia, R. (29 November 2005). "'Police acted according to rules'". New Straits Times, p. 6.
