= Ibrahim Ali (politician) =

Malaysian politician (born 1951)

Yang Berbahagia Dato' Ibrahim Ali DPMS DMSM
- إبراهيم علي
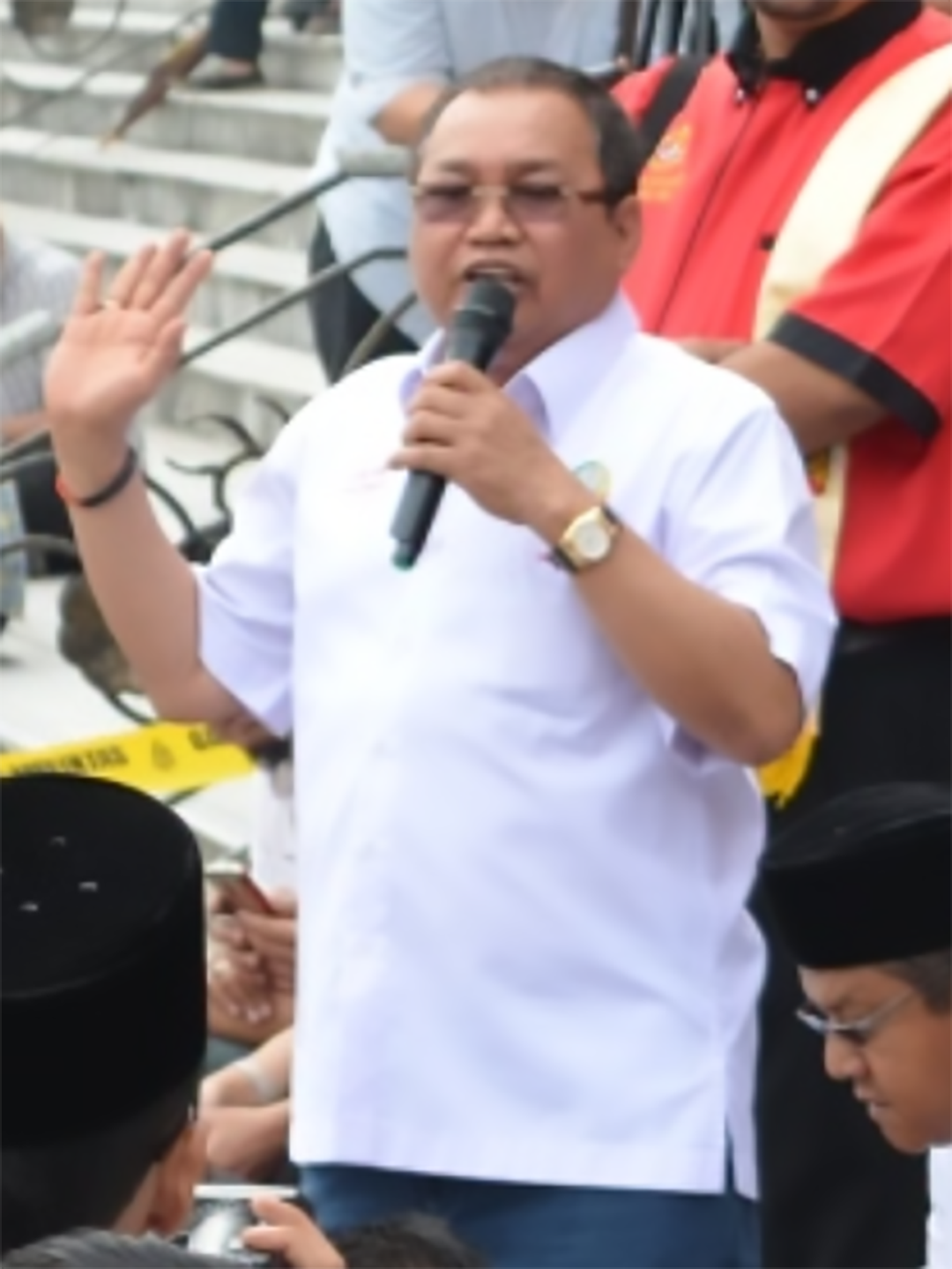

1st President of the Parti Bumiputera Perkasa Malaysia
- Incumbent
- Assumed office 8 May 2019
- Deputy: Khalid Yunus
- Preceded by: Position established

Member of the Malaysian Parliament for Pasir Mas
- In office 8 March 2008 – 5 May 2013
- Preceded by: Ismail Noh (PAS)
- Succeeded by: Nik Mohamad Abduh Nik Abdul Aziz (PAS)
- In office 3 August 1986 – 25 April 1995
- Preceded by: Wan Ibrahim Wan Abdullah (PAS)
- Succeeded by: Zainudin Mohamad Nor (S46)

Personal details
- Born: Ibrahim bin Ali; 25 January 1951 (age 75) Tumpat, Kelantan, Federation of Malaya (now Malaysia)
- Party: Pan-Malaysian Islamic Front (BERJASA) (1978–1981); United Malay National Organisation (UMNO) (1981–1988; 1991–2003); Semangat 46 (S46) (1988–1991); Independent (2003–2008, 2008–2018); Malaysian Islamic Party (PAS) (2008); Parti Bumiputera Perkasa Malaysia (PUTRA) (2018–present)
- Other political affiliations: Barisan Nasional (BN) (1981–1988; 1991–2003); Angkatan Perpaduan Ummah (APU) (1990–1991); Gagasan Rakyat (GR) (1990–1991); Pakatan Rakyat (PR) (2008); Gerakan Tanah Air (GTA) (2022–present)
- Education: Universiti Teknologi Mara (UITM) IIC University of Technology (PhD)
- Occupation: Politician

Ibrahim bin Ali (Jawi: إبراهيم بن علي; born 25 January 1951) is a Malaysian politician. He is informally known as Tok Him. He served as the Member of Parliament (MP) for Pasir Mas from August 1986 to April 1995 and again from March 2008 to May 2013. He is a member of the Parti Bumiputera Perkasa Malaysia (PUTRA), a component party of the Gerakan Tanah Air (GTA) opposition coalition. He has served as the 1st and founding President of PUTRA since May 2019. He is also founding President of the Malay dominance organisation Pertubuhan Pribumi Perkasa (PERKASA).

== Early life and education ==
Ibrahim was born on 25 January 1951 in Kampung Pasir Pekan, Tumpat, Kelantan. He is the fifth child and eldest boy of 13 children. His father, Ali Mohamad @ Che Leh was the village head.

Ibrahim first studied at Sekolah Kebangsaan Padang Mandul, then at Sekolah Kebangsaan Pasir Pekan. He was then sent to an English primary school in another district, Tanah Merah. He was sent to live with his uncle as his parents were unable support a big family. Ibrahim spent his secondary school years in Sekolah Kebangsaan Islah and did Lower Six and Upper Six in a private school, Maktab Abadi. There, he lived underneath the school and would work part-time while studying when he could not afford the fees. After completing his high school certificate (HSC), he signed up to do a Bachelor of Laws (LLB) in Institut Teknology Mara (ITM (now Universiti Teknologi MARA, UiTM)), but later switched his course to mass communications instead.

He obtained his Doctor of Philosophy (PhD) from IIC University of Technology, Cambodia in 2017.

== Political career ==
Prior to his involvement in politics, Ibrahim was a student activist in his younger days at his tertiary institution, and had later joined the Pan-Malaysian Islamic Front (BERJASA). He was first elected to Parliament in the 1986 general election for the Pasir Mas seat in Kelantan representing the United Malay National Organisation (UMNO) of the then-ruling Barisan Nasional (BN) coalition.

However, he later left the party alongside others and joined the UMNO-breakaway Parti Melayu Semangat 46 (Semangat 46) and successfully defended the seat in the 1990 Malaysian general election. In 1991, he rejoined UMNO but lost his seat to the Semangat 46 candidate in the 1995 general election. He was again the UMNO candidate for the Pasir Mas seat in the 1999 Malaysian general election and as an independent candidate in the 2004 Malaysian general election. He was unable to win the seat in both elections.

Ibrahim also contested as Independent in the 2005 Pengkalan Pasir by-election but lost in the three-cornered fight. In the 2008 general election, he successfully contested for the Pasir Mas seat on the banner and endorsement of the Pan-Malaysian Islamic Party (PAS). However, Ibrahim subsequently fell out with PAS, and sat as an independent in parliament whilst indicating a willingness to support the BN government. He again lost his seat as independent to newcomer Nik Mohamad Abduh Nik Abdul Aziz of PAS despite BN's decision to not field a candidate for the seat in the 2013 general election. In the 2018 general election, he contested again as an independent candidate but lost.

Ibrahim founded a new party; PUTRA in 2019 after the downfall of BN government in the 2018 Malaysian general election and became the party's first president.

== Perkasa ==
After the 2008 Malaysian general election, Ibrahim founded Perkasa, a non-governmental organisation (NGO) and pressure group for Malay rights, which has taken a hardline stance against what they perceive to be infringements on Malay rights. Ibrahim and the NGO has been notorious for making baseless and controversial statements against non-Malay and non-Muslim groups in Malaysia. The group opposes abolition of the 30% ownership quota for Bumiputera citizens in allocation for government projects. It also claims that the ethnic Chinese were dominating the Malaysian economy. Ibrahim said that the Chinese should not be too greedy and sympathise with the Malay population who still lagged behind in certain areas.

Ibrahim has resigned twice as Perkasa president, once in 2013 and again in 2018. Both resignations were rejected by the Perkasa Supreme Council.

The NGO has been considered the origin of the formation of Ibrahim's new party PUTRA later after the 2018 Malaysian general election in 2019.

== Controversies ==
=== Interview with Al Jazeera ===
During an interview with Al Jazeera English, Ibrahim denied that non-Malays were being unfairly treated in Malaysia, but emphasised instead that Malays have "sacrificed a lot of [their] interest." The interview was noted for his use of the word "Shit" three times which was bleeped out during the broadcast.

=== Mocking of Karpal Singh ===
During a 2008 parliamentary sitting, he mocked Democratic Action Party (DAP) chairman and Bukit Gelugor MP, Karpal Singh for not being able to stand while speaking. He received furious comments from opposition politicians as Karpal was disabled and was forced to make an apology. In it, he promised not to stand up in Parliament for a whole month.

=== Sexist remarks on Malaysian wives ===
In April 2011, he made perceived sexist remarks in Parliament, blaming "wives who neglect their responsibilities" for Malaysian men having extramarital sex.

=== "Nerf war" on Christian ===
In May 2011, following the controversy over an alleged plot by Christians in Malaysia to supplant Islam as the official religion in Malaysia which was reported by Utusan Malaysia, Ibrahim threatened to wage "Nerf war" against Christians.

=== Bersih 2.0 rally ===
In June 2011, he allegedly warned the community not to turn up in support of the 2011 Bersih 2.0 rally, saying that if chaos erupts, "I believe the Chinese community will have to stock up on food." The remark was perceived as racially charged, with UMNO Youth leader Khairy Jamaluddin calling Ibrahim a racist. Ibrahim later claimed he was merely giving advice, but was being misunderstood as threatening the ethnic Chinese community. Despite promising earlier to bring 15 thousand Perkasa supporters to counter the Bersih rally, he was not seen on day of the rally. He later claimed that he was unwell and did not get his wife's permission to attend the counter rally.

=== "White ang pow" incident ===
In January 2012 during an event celebrating the Chinese New Year, in an incident which has come to be known as "white ang pow", he distributed small monetary gifts that were contained within white envelopes instead of red ones. White ang pows are customarily handed out only at funerals. Some described the choice of colour a deliberate attempt to remind the Chinese community. However, a spokesman said rather than turning away the greater than expected number of guests empty handed, white envelopes were used when they ran out of red ones.

=== Seize and burn Bibles containing the word "Allah" ===
In January 2013, he has called on Muslims to seize and burn copies of Bibles which contain the term "Allah" or other Arabic religious words. At least a dozen police reports have been made against him as a result of his actions, but despite the seditious nature of his statement, the authorities have so far been reluctant to press charges. This has led the public to accuse the government of selective prosecution, as Ibrahim Ali is known to be aligned towards the ruling UMNO-BN party.

=== Chin Peng's remains ===
In September 2013 Ibrahim Ali expressed protest and opposed any attempts to bring the remains of the former secretary-general of the Malayan Communist Party, Chin Peng back to Malaysia. He said that he will never allow Chin Peng to return to Malaysia regardless of whether he is alive or dead. He also said any record of Chin Peng should be erased from the annals of the country's history and kept from the eyes of the younger generation, adding that Chin Peng's remains should be "tossed into the air". Perkasa secretary-general Syed Hassan Syed Ali warned Malaysian Chinese Association (MCA) not to upset the Malays by insisting that the Malaysian government should allow Chin Peng's remains to be brought back to Malaysia.

=== Bumiputera Economic Empowerment Plan ===
On 16 September 2013, Ibrahim Ali insisted that RM 1.4 trillion was needed to assist Prime Minister of Malaysia Datuk Seri Najib Razak's RM31bil Bumiputera Economic Empowerment Plan (BEEP) to increase economic status of the Malay.

On 6 October 2013, Ibrahim Ali warned of another race riot if the majority of the Foreign Labour remained in poverty, praising Najib Razak of making the right decision by implementing the new RM31bil BEEP intended to increase the economic status of the Malays. Ibrahim said that the 13 May riots occurred because the Malays were not satisfied. Many critics say that the programme has further entrenched race-based policies and inhibited Malaysia's economic competitiveness which results in a huge brain drain of many non-Malays.

=== Banning of Malay language bible ===
On 17 October 2013, Ibrahim Ali urged Prime Minister Najib Razak to ban the Malay language bible in Malaysia, commenting that the government had been too compromising and gave in to the demands of the Christians in Malaysia as they are not satisfied enough because the Christians insisted on using the word "Allah" in the bible. Ibrahim claims that "Allah" can only be used by Muslims in Malaysia. He added that the Malays had been "trodden and spat on" by "ungrateful Christians" and demanded the government to ban the Malay language bible as a retaliation. He resorted to name-calling by describing DAP Secretary General Lim Guan Eng as a "pig" for defending the Christians' right to use the word "Allah" in the bible. He also mocked the Christians saying that the Christians insisted that they use the word "Allah" because they had no name for their own God.

=== Contempt of court ===
On 19 November 2013, Ibrahim Ali was fined RM20,000 and jailed one day by the High Court of Kuala Lumpur after being held in contempt of court over an article in the Perkasa website which made disparaging remarks about Justice VT Singam, who had presided over a defamation suit in which opposition leader Anwar Ibrahim had successfully claimed damages for libel against the pro-establishment mouthpiece Utusan Malaysia. The author of the offending article was sentenced to four weeks' jail.

== Election results ==
Parliament of Malaysia
Year	Constituency	Candidate	Votes	Pct	Opponent(s)	Votes	Pct	Ballots cast	Majority	Turnout
1986	P020 Pasir Mas	Ibrahim Ali (UMNO)	15,711	56.90%	Zakaria Ismail (PAS)	11,903	43.10%	28,375	3,808	73.85%
1990	P020 Pasir Mas	Ibrahim Ali (S46)	20,066	65.06%	Hanafi Mamat (UMNO)	10,776	34.02%	31,679	9,290	75.60%
1995	P022 Pasir Mas	Ibrahim Ali (UMNO)	16,178	45.48%	Zainudin Mohd Nor (S46)	19,394	54.52%	36,991	3,216	86.52%
1999	P022 Pasir Mas	Ibrahim Ali (UMNO)	15,392	39.11%	Ismail Noh (PAS)	23,967	60.89%	39,949	8,575	78.08%
2004	P022 Pasir Mas	Ibrahim Ali (IND)	6,198	15.10%	Ismail Noh (PAS)	17,526	43.82%	41,395	1,251	78.44%
2004	P022 Pasir Mas	Ibrahim Ali (IND)	6,198	15.10%	Abd Rahim Abd Rahman (UMNO)	16,275	40.69%	41,395	1,251	78.44%
2008	P022 Pasir Mas	Ibrahim Ali (PAS)	28,673	59.30%	Ahmad Rosdi Mahmad (UMNO)	19,682	40.70%	49,344	8,991	82.74%
2013	P022 Pasir Mas	Ibrahim Ali (IND)	25,384	43.16%	Nik Mohamad Abduh Nik Abdul Aziz (PAS)	33,431	56.84%	60,168	8,047	83.61%
2018	P022 Pasir Mas	Ibrahim Ali (IND)	5,373	10.03%	Ahmad Fadhli Shaari (PAS)	28,080	52.44%	55,319	13,075	77.67%
2018	P022 Pasir Mas	Ibrahim Ali (IND)	5,373	10.03%	Nor Azmawi Abd Rahman (UMNO)	15,005	28.02%	55,319	13,075	77.67%
2018	P022 Pasir Mas	Ibrahim Ali (IND)	5,373	10.03%	Che Ujang Che Daud (PPBM)	5,093	9.51%	55,319	13,075	77.67%
2022	P023 Rantau Panjang	Ibrahim Ali (PUTRA)	1,216	2.01%	Siti Zailah Mohd Yusoff (PAS)	37,759	62.38%	61,406	20,636	64.91%
2022	P023 Rantau Panjang	Ibrahim Ali (PUTRA)	1,216	2.01%	Zulkarnain Yusoff (UMNO)	17,123	28.29%	61,406	20,636	64.91%
2022	P023 Rantau Panjang	Ibrahim Ali (PUTRA)	1,216	2.01%	Wan Shah Jihan Wan Din (AMANAH)	4,256	7.03%	61,406	20,636	64.91%
2022	P023 Rantau Panjang	Ibrahim Ali (PUTRA)	1,216	2.01%	Mohd Zain Ismail (PRM)	172	0.29%	61,406	20,636	64.91%

Kelantan State Legislative Assembly
Year	Constituency	Candidate	Votes	Pct	Opponent(s)	Votes	Pct	Ballots cast	Majority	Turnout
2005	N12 Pengkalan Pasir	Ibrahim Ali (IND)	134	0.87%	Hanafi Mamat (UMNO)	7,422	48.04%	15450	139	83.04%
2005	N12 Pengkalan Pasir	Ibrahim Ali (IND)	134	0.87%	Hanifa Ahmad (PAS)	7,288	47.17%	15450	139	83.04%
2018	N11 Tendong	Ibrahim Ali (IND)	1,479	6.20%	Rozi Muhamad (PAS)	8,951	37.40%	19,159	2,251	80.10%
2018	N11 Tendong	Ibrahim Ali (IND)	1,479	6.20%	Yahaya Mamat (UMNO)	6.700	28.00%	19,159	2,251	80.10%
2018	N11 Tendong	Ibrahim Ali (IND)	1,479	6.20%	Wan Zulkhairi Wan Md Zain (PPBM)	1,360	5.70%	19,159	2,251	80.10%

== Honours ==
=== Honours of Malaysia ===
- Kelantan
  - Knight Commander of the Order of the Life of the Crown of Kelantan (DJMK) – Dato' (2003, revoked 2010)
- Malacca
  - Companion Class I of the Exalted Order of Malacca (DMSM) – Datuk (1994)
- Selangor
  - Knight Commander of the Order of the Crown of Selangor (DPMS) – Dato' (1999)

== See also ==
- Pasir Mas (federal constituency)
- Pertubuhan Pribumi Perkasa
- Parti Bumiputera Perkasa Malaysia
