= Perkasa =

Malay supremacist non-governmental organisation (NGO)

Pertubuhan Pribumi Perkasa ڤرتوبوهن ڤريبومي ڤرکاس Mighty Native Organisation PERKASA
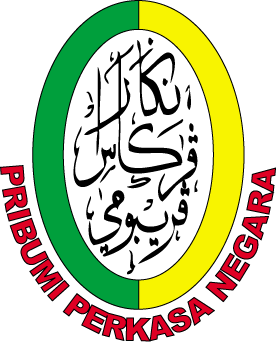
- Formation: 2008
- Type: Malay supremacy, Malayisation, extreme-right, ultra-nationalism, Islamonationalism, Cultural chauvinism
- Location: Malaysia
- Key people: Ibrahim Ali
- Website: www.pribumiperkasa.com

Pertubuhan Pribumi Perkasa (Malay for "Mighty Native Organisation" or better known by its acronym: Perkasa), is a Malay supremacist non-governmental organisation (NGO) that was formed by Ibrahim Ali in the aftermath of the 2008 general election (GE12). This conservative, extreme-right, ethnic Malay organisation is led by its president Ibrahim Ali. The group is reported to have a membership of 700,000.

The major objectives for establishing Perkasa, according to Ibrahim Ali, are to act as "protectors of Article 153 of the Constitution of Malaysia" and to defend the rights of Bumiputera from being eroded by certain quarters. Perkasa is said to be fighting and defending the rights of the Malays which they feel are being challenged by non-Malays in Malaysia.

Perkasa has recently become infamous for its racial and religious provocations against non-Malays, especially Chinese and Indians; and non-Muslims, especially Christians through vocal, physical and violent means. Despite the continuous offensive and seditious remarks by its chief Ibrahim Ali and its members that have threatened social harmony, no legal action has been taken by the Malaysian authorities so far. It has been branded a fascist organisation by MPs from the Malaysian federal opposition coalition Pakatan Rakyat (PR) in the past.

In September 2010, Ibrahim Ali claimed that 60% of Perkasa members were United Malays National Organisation (UMNO) members. However, both Ibrahim Ali and UMNO's secretary-general Tengku Adnan denied any ties between UMNO and Perkasa although both of them agreed that several UMNO members are also Perkasa members.

Despite Perkasa's close association with UMNO, Ibrahim Ali during Perkasa's 2013 annual general assembly, had alleged that UMNO had shown weakness and become "toothless" in their efforts to safeguard the rights of the Malays and had implied the possibility of Perkasa becoming a full-fledged political party to participate in 2018 general election (GE14), going head-to-head against UMNO. In 2018, after the GE14 which saw the downfall of Barisan Nasional (BN) and UMNO government, Ibrahim Ali finally founded Parti Bumiputera Perkasa Malaysia (PUTRA); a new party that based on the UMNO original constitution to serve as an alternative to the Malays and the new party registration was approved in 2019.

== Leadership ==
Ibrahim Ali, the former Pasir Mas Member of Parliament, is the founder and first president of Perkasa. The other leader of Perkasa is its Deputy President Dato' Fuad Hassan (2008–2014). Ibrahim has attempted twice to resign as Perkasa president in 2013 and again in 2018, but both were rejected by Perkasa's supreme council.

== Recent events ==
- On 12 February 2010, some 1,000 members from Perkasa and Selangor UMNO marched from the Sultan Salahuddin Abdul Aziz Mosque to the Selangor State Secretariat Building in Shah Alam, Selangor, to protest the Selangor state government's handling of the quit rent issue involving Yayasan Basmi Kemiskinan (YBK).
- On 29 April 2010, Perkasa president Ibrahim Ali filed a defamation suit, seeking RM 10mil worth of damages against Malaysian English daily The Sun after the newspaper allegedly described Ibrahim Ali as a leader of a "chauvinist" group and he was "extreme in championing the rights of a certain race".
- On 28 September 2010, a group of 50 Perkasa members protested against controversial Malaysian rapper Wee Meng Chee (Namewee) by torching his posters outside the Kuala Lumpur and Selangor Chinese Assembly Hall (KLSCAH) where Namewee was about to speak at a youth forum.
- On 25 April 2011, about 100 Perkasa members and supporters held a protest outside the MCA headquarters in Kuala Lumpur after the party's call to boycott the Malaysian Malay language daily Utusan Malaysia, in response to the daily's "1 Melayu, 1 Bumi" initiative. Perkasa secretary general Syed Hassan Syed Ali defended Utusan Malaysia, saying that the newspaper is not being racist as it only defended Malay rights enshrined in the constitution.
- On 14 August 2011, Perkasa staged a protest by burning copies of the Malaysian English-language daily The Star and to show dissatisfaction of the English newspaper which promoted non-halal food outlets that serve pork on its dining supplement for Muslims during the Muslim holy month of Ramadan. Its president Ibrahim Ali then urged all Muslims to brand The Star newspaper as anti-Muslim and anti-Malay for disturbing the sensitivities of the Muslims.
- On 26 February 2012, a group of UMNO and Perkasa members attacked and injured demonstrators and members of the press during an anti-Lynas protest at the Speaker's Corner, Padang Kota Lama, Penang. Two journalists from the Chinese-language daily Kwong Wah Yit Poh were beaten and injured. There were news reports where Perkasa members threatened protesters with foul language and racist remarks.
- On 6 April 2012, Perkasa members were reported attacking PKR members during an official launch of the PKR's new branch office in Jalan Putra, Alor Setar, Kedah.
- On 10 May 2012, a group of 30 Perkasa members hold a mock funeral ceremony in front of Chief Minister of Penang Lim Guan Eng's residence at Pinhorn Road and also the latter's office in Komtar, Penang as a sign of protest to show dissatisfaction of the latter's administration of the Penang state government.
- On 30 June 2012, a group of Penang Perkasa members protested against Chief Minister of Penang Lim Guan Eng by carrying banners and posters at the Teluk Bahang market in Penang, which ended up in a scuffle with shoving and pushing. The latter claimed that someone had roughly brushed against him from behind when he was about to leave.
- On 2 September 2012, PKR members reported that Perkasa members were attacking members of the public attending a tazkirah (Muslim religious sermon) by Opposition Leader Datuk Seri Anwar Ibrahim at a mosque in Alor Setar, Kedah.
- On 8 March 2013, a group representing various NGOs - Perkasa, National Silat Federation (Pesaka), Pertubuhan Kebajikan Islamiah dan Dakwah (Pekida), Penang Muslim Network (JMPP), Federation of Peninsula Malay Students (GPMS), Penang Pencinta Malaysia Association (Pencinta), and Pertubuhan Kebajikan Al-Ehsan staged a protest at Komtar, Penang to demand an apology from Penang Chief Minister Lim Guan Eng over the latter's call to allow Christians in Malaysia to use the word "Allah". They allegedly tried to break the glass doors to gain entry into the Penang state administration office in an attempt to hand in a "clock" to Lim Guan Eng(giving a clock to person in Chinese culture means wishing death to the said person's parents).
- On 14 October 2013, a group of Perkasa members gathered outside the Federal Court when the Court of Appeal ruled that the Catholic Church is prohibited from using the word "Allah" in the Malay language section of its weekly newspaper, Herald. Perkasa president Ibrahim Ali shouted cries of "Praise be to Allah", saying that the people should stop bringing up the issue and urged politicians not to politicise the issue.
- On 18 January 2014, about 600 Penang UMNO and Perkasa members staged a street protest with provocative banners against Machang Bubok PKR assemblyman Lee Khai Loon in Seberang Jaya, Penang. Earlier, Lee Khai Loon has organised a flash mob by stuffing kangkung (water spinach) into an effigy of Malaysian Prime Minister Datuk Seri Najib Tun Razak in Alma, Bukit Mertajam. Some of the banners contained racial provocative sentiments. Penang UMNO Youth secretary Datuk Musa Sheikh Fadzir warned Lee and Pakatan Rakyat not to provoke the Malay race by ridiculing their leaders, Islam, the police and other Malay institutions, threatening another 13 May riots.
- On 19 January 2014, two men were assaulted during a rally held by UMNO and Perkasa in support of the Malaysian Prime Minister Datuk Seri Najib Tun Razak's kangkung remarks in Alma, Bukit Mertajam. The protesters had earlier gathered at a food court in Alma and then proceeding to Machang Bubok assemblyman Lee Khai Loon's service centre. The group also burnt a paper effigy of the latter.
- On 21 January 2014, a group of protesters from UMNO Youth, Perkasa, Pekida, Persatuan Mukabuku and Al-Ehsan staged a violent demonstration and assaulted Penang Island Municipal Council enforcement officers during the demolition of illegal food stalls at Teluk Awak Flat in Jalan Hassan Abas, Teluk Bahang, Penang. However, no arrest has been made by the police since.
- On 21 May 2014, Penang Perkasa Youth Chief and several Penang UMNO members had staged a protest in front of the Penang State Assembly Building over Seri Delima state assemblyman RSN Rayer's "UMNO celaka" remark. They stormed into the state assembly hall by crashing through the gates of the building. They have also demanded apology from RSN Rayer.
- On 12 October 2014, a rowdy group which consists of members of Perkasa, UMNO Youth and Persatuan Gabungan Melayu Islam Pulau Pinang harassed and chased away demonstrators in a peaceful gathering to repeal the Sedition Act organised by Gerakan Hapus Akta Hasutan (GHAH) in Speaker's Corner, Padang Kota Lama, Penang. Two British women who were passing by were physically assaulted and called Jews by the mob. However, the police did not prevent the violent disruption and only intervened when the situation got worse when the mob began pushing, chasing and cornering GHAH supporters and bystanders.
- On 26 December 2014, a group of representatives from Perkasa and 100 Malay villagers staged a protest against the Selangor State Government at the Selangor State Secretariat Building for approving the building of a high-tech pig farm in Kampung Sepat, Kuala Langat. They handed over a memorandum to Selangor Menteri Besar Azmin Ali. They said that building a pig farm near a Malay village was an insult to the Malays and added that Azmin should speak up in defence of the Malays.

== Controversies ==
=== Publication of seditious articles ===
On 1 July 2010, the official organ of Perkasa, Suara Perkasa published an article on its front page asking Dr. Wee Ka Siong to be detained under Internal Security Act (ISA) for questioning the special position of Bumiputera which is under the Article 153 of the Constitution of Malaysia. However, Wee dismissed Perkasa's allegation. Suara Perkasa was called by the Malaysian Home Ministry the following day for an explanation. The article received a backlash by the component parties in Barisan Nasional, including United Malays National Organisation (UMNO), Malaysian Chinese Association (MCA) and Malaysian Indian Congress (MIC). On 5 July 2010, the controversial Suara Perkasa was let off with a warning by the Home Ministry for publishing an article that could have jeopardised national unity. However some members of UMNO, the leading component of the ruling Barisan Nasional government in Malaysia are supporters of its founder, who was also previously a member of the political party. Datuk Ibrahim Ali was an independent MP in his home state of Kelantan and was known to have strong grassroots support in his constituency. He is also close to the top leadership of UMNO (United Malay National Organisation) and at one time was a member of the Supreme Council of that party. He is still an influential politician and was also close to the previous Deputy Minister of Malaysia, Datuk Seri Anwar Ibrahim, as they were previously members of ABIM (Angkatan Belia Islam Malaysia - Malaysian Islamic Youth Assembly) which the former deputy minister headed. Datuk Seri Ibrahim Ali was the Member of Parliament for Pasir Mas (2008–2013), a constituency in his home state of Kelantan. He is now rallying support from Malaysians to reject Datuk Seri Anwar Ibrahim as the next Malaysian leader on account of the alleged personality flaws of the latter. This movement seems to gather much momentum among the rural Malays and Malaysians in general as can be evidenced by massive turnout especially among his Malay supporters. He is aided in his campaign by Datuk Hassan Ali, a former member of Parti Islam Se-Malaysia who had left the Pakatan Rakyat coalition top leadership because of differences of opinion on multiple issues, one of which relating to the controversial use of the word Allah in the Bible.

=== Counter protest against Bersih 2.0 ===
During the Perkasa Anti-Bersih launch at Kelab Sultan Sulaiman on 19 June 2011 which is a counter protest of Bersih 2.0 rally, president Ibrahim Ali was reported stoking racial tension in his speech, warning the Chinese to "stock up food" as "anything can happen", because he claimed that if Bersih 2.0 rally was not cancelled, racial riots similar to 13 May incident may happen. In other word, he implied that the Chinese should be staying indoors to avoid any trouble on the day of the Bersih 2.0 rally on 9 July 2011. Following his speech, lawmakers from both sides of the political divide have accused him of turning the rally, which was supposed to be demanding for free and fair election, into a racial issue. UMNO Youth Chief Khairy Jamaluddin suggested that Ibrahim Ali should be probed under the Sedition Act.

=== Distribution of white angpows ===
During the Chinese New Year celebration organised by Perkasa in February 2012, Perkasa president Ibrahim Ali was reported distributing RM10,000 packed in "white-coloured angpows" to ethnic-Chinese senior citizens. This has angered many ethnic-Chinese in Malaysia of touching the sensitivities of the Chinese. In Chinese culture, money given out in white packets is traditionally-associated with the 'pak kam' (white gold), which are donations given out at funerals. His actions has received heavy criticisms from Malaysian Chinese leaders such as MCA Young Professionals Bureau chief Datuk Chua Tee Yong, MCA Youth secretary-general Datuk Chai Kim Sen and MCA Youth chief Datuk Dr Wee Ka Siong, with many described the president's actions as "disrespectful" and "insensitive". Ibrahim Ali then eventually expressed regret for not being aware of the cultural taboo of the Malaysian Chinese and added that such mistakes could be avoided, giving an excuse that they have run out of red-coloured ang pows.

=== Chinese as a national security threat ===
On 12 December 2012, Perkasa chief Datuk Ibrahim Ali commented that of late the Malaysian Chinese have been playing up political sentiments and accused the country's second-largest ethnic group of forgotten how living in Malaysia is "like heaven". He also commented that the Chinese community will become a national security threat which would result in racial riots similar to the 13 May incident if it grows more powerful economically and politically.

=== Crusade threat against Christians ===
On 12 May 2011, its president Ibrahim Ali launched a crusade against Christians if the community proceeds with its agenda to replace Islam as Malaysia's official religion, criticising them as being ungrateful people, during a speech organised by the Kommuniti 1 Malaysia in Kampung Changkat, Gombak, Selangor, which was attended by several UMNO leaders. His called for a holy war against Christians after a news report from Utusan Malaysia claiming that the Christians and DAP had a conspiracy of turning Malaysia into a Christian country. In response, the DAP had criticised the Malaysian government for its refusal to apprehend Ibrahim Ali for his seditious remark, declaring this as a proof that UMNO is backing the Perkasa leader, with DAP Secretary-General Lim Guan Eng describing Perkasa as an "alter ego" of UMNO. Meanwhile, Gerakan president Tan Sri Dr Koh Tsu Koon called for a full investigation into all of Ibrahim's speeches made, commented that the leader was "uncouth" and in clear violation of the concept of "1Malaysia".

=== Call to burn Malay language bibles ===
On 21 January 2013, Perkasa again courted intense public outrage when Ibrahim Ali called on Muslims to burn Malay-language bibles which use the term "Allah" in their texts. Perkasa president Ibrahim Ali had made a call during the Perkasa convention in Permatang Pauh, Penang, urging Muslims to burn the Malay language version of the Christian Holy Bibles that contain the words "Allah" and other religious Arabic words written in Jawi. He then threatened that he would quit supporting the Barisan Nasional after receiving criticisms from leaders of MCA and MIC. He then added that he did not intend to offend the Christians and instigating racial and religious tension but as a solution to prevent an alleged conversion of Muslims by evangelists. Responding to Ibrahim's remarks, MIC leader S. Vell Paari urged the government to punish the right-wing Perkasa president or face the possibility of losing its non-Muslim votes. This has resulted in Ibrahim Ali's alleged statement being investigated under the Sedition Act by the Malaysian police after several police reports lodged.

=== Religious insensitivity towards Hindus ===
On 29 March 2013, Perkasa vice-president and Kulim-Bandar Baharu MP Zulkifli Noordin has been heavily criticised by several Hindu politicians after giving a religious sermon belittling Hinduism. A YouTube video of the speech has been circulating on social media. In his speech, he explained how he laughed at the Indian traders on why the Hindu gods could not prevent the trader's shop from being flooded. He also questioned the purity and holiness of the Ganges River, India, which is considered sacred by the Hindus, claiming that the Ganges River is filled with chicken carcasses and twigs floating. Besides that, Zulkifli also mocked the Hindu god Lord Ganesha, by questioning why the Hindus are fighting over buying the deity's statue with the trunk broken. He also questioned the holiness of the Hindu gods when he said when the broken parts of the statue can just be mended by plaster.

The video clip has sparked outrage among many people from the Malaysian Hindu community. PKR vice-president and lawyer N. Surendran wants Zulkifli to be charged with Section 298A of the Penal Code for uttering words which causes disharmony, feelings of enmity, hatred or ill-will on grounds of religion. He added that Zulkifli is a close ally with Malaysian Prime Minister Datuk Seri Najib Tun Razak, in which he described that UMNO and Barisan Nasional must take responsibility for the sacrilegious remarks and mockery of Hinduism.

MIC central working committee member Datuk T. Rajagopalu told Zulkifli to "shut up" and apologise for his insensitive remarks against the Hindus. He added that Zulkifli is unfit to be an MP, describing the lawyer as a half-baked lawyer and not a true Muslim man. MIC vice-president Datuk S.K. Devamany also demanded that Zulkifli apologise and withdraw his remarks. Aside from them, MIC central working committee member P. Kamalanathan condemned Zulkifli's remarks "in the harshest manner possible." Human rights group SUARAM also rebuked Zulkifli and urged voters to reject him in the upcoming Malaysian 13th general elections. Hindu Sangam chief said that no legal action were taken against Zulkifli because he is a Muslim and vice-president of Perkasa.

Zulkifli later apologised on 1 April 2013 for hurting the feelings of the Indian community, but only days later another video clip emerged in which Zulkifli was caught uttering the word "Keling" during a speech, a word deemed to be extremely offensive towards ethnic Indians.

=== Death of Chin Peng ===
Perkasa expressed protest and opposed any attempts to bring the remains of the former secretary-general of the Malayan Communist Party Chin Peng back to Malaysia. Ibrahim Ali said that he will never allow Chin Peng to return to Malaysian regardless whether he is alive or dead. He also said any record of Chin Peng should be erased from the annals of the country's history and kept from the eyes of the younger generation, adding that Chin Peng's remains should be "tossed into the air". Perkasa secretary-general Syed Hassan Syed Ali warned MCA not to upset the Malays by insisting that the Malaysian government should allow Chin Peng's remains to be brought back to Malaysia.

=== Racial riot Threats ===
Perkasa president Datuk Ibrahim Ali has warned of another race riot if the majority of the Malays remained in poverty, praising Prime Minister of Malaysia Datuk Seri Najib Razak of making the right decision by implementing the new RM31bil Bumiputera Economic Empowerment Plan (BEEP) intended to increase the economic status of the Malays. He said that the 13 May riots occurred because the Malays were not satisfied. Many critics say that the programme has further entrenched race-based policies and inhibit Malaysia's economic competitiveness which then results in a huge brain drain of many non-Malays.

=== Call on ban of Malay bibles ===
On 17 October 2013, Perkasa president Datuk Ibrahim Ali urged Prime Minister of Malaysia Datuk Seri Najib Tun Razak to ban the Malay language bible in Malaysia, commenting that the government had been too compromising and give in to the demands of the Christians in Malaysia as they are not satisfied enough because the Christians insisted on using the word "Allah" in the bible, which he claims that "Allah" can only be used by Muslims in Malaysia. He added that the Malays had been "trodden and spat on" by "ungrateful Christians" and demanded the government to ban the Malay language bible as a retaliation. He resorted to name-calling by describing DAP Secretary General Lim Guan Eng as a "pig" for defending the Christians right to use the word "Allah" in the bible. He also mocked the Christians saying that the Christians insisted that they use the word "Allah" because they had no name for their own God.

== Criticism ==
On 9 July 2010, the group was labelled 'militant' by former US Ambassador to Malaysia John Malott.

The group has been criticised by former parliamentary leader of the opposition Lim Kit Siang from Democratic Action Party (DAP) of Pakatan Rakyat, for re-using the religion, race and nationalism card when it's been "proven obsolete and irrelevant in bringing progress and change to Malay social and economic development". It had the tacit support of the former Prime Minister of Malaysia Datuk Seri Mahathir Mohamed when the latter attended its inauguration ceremony.

State Parti Gerakan Rakyat Malaysia (Gerakan) official and lawyer Baljit Singh has condemned Perkasa as the Malaysian version of the white American supremacist movement Ku Klux Klan, which openly advocates racism, religious extremism and fascism. He added that Perkasa incites racial hatred and social disharmony by threatening to wage a holy war against Christians and other ethnic and religious minorities in Malaysia.

Perkasa had also received backlash from two ethnic-Chinese Barisan Nasional leaders, namely Penang Gerakan chief Datuk Teng Hock Nan and MCA deputy secretary Loh Chew June, whom they labelled the right-wing Malay group as "racists". Perkasa Youth Chief Arman Azha Abu Hanifah then demanded apology from the duo. Loh responded that he did not need apology as Perkasa's actions were to segregate everyone and hampering the concept of '1Malaysia' mooted by Malaysian Prime Minister Najib Razak. Loh also lambasted its president Ibrahim Ali for flashing the 'keris' (Malay dagger) during the group's congress which may stoke racial tension in Malaysia.
