= Pengkalan Pasir =

- Town in Malaysia
- Pengkalan Pasir in Kelantan, Malay Peninsular and Malaysia Pengkalan Pasir (Peninsular Malaysia) Pengkalan Pasir (Malaysia)
- Coordinates: 6°2′54.96″N 102°9′12.23″E
- Country: Malaysia
- State: Kelantan
- District: Pasir Mas
- Time zone: UTC+8 (MYT)
- Postal code: 17000

Pengkalan Pasir is a small town in Pasir Mas District, Kelantan, Malaysia.

== Events ==
- 6 December 2005 - Pengkalan Pasir by-elections
