= Hanifa Ahmad =

Malaysian politician

Yang Berbahagia Dato' Hanifa Ahmad DJMK
- حنفية أحمد

Exco roles (Kelantan)
- 2010–2013: Deputy Chairman of the Public Administration, Land Development and Region
- 2013–2018: Chairman of the Infrastructure, Utilities and Information Technology
- 2018–2023: Chairman of the Industry, Trade, Investment and Entrepreneur Development

Faction represented in Kelantan State Legislative Assembly
- 2008–2020: Malaysian Islamic Party
- 2020–2023: Perikatan Nasional

Personal details
- Born: 8 August 1946 (age 79) Kelantan, Malayan Union (now Malaysia)
- Citizenship: Malaysian
- Party: Malaysian Islamic Party (PAS)
- Other political affiliations: Perikatan Nasional (PN); Muafakat Nasional (MN); Gagasan Sejahtera (GS); Pakatan Rakyat (PR)
- Spouse: Datin Zaharah Rosminah Amaluddin (died 2021)
- Occupation: Politician

Hanifa bin Ahmad is a Malaysian politician and has served as Kelantan State Executive Councillor.

== Election results ==
Kelantan State Legislative Assembly
Year	Constituency	Candidate	Votes	Pct	Opponent(s)	Votes	Pct	Ballots cast	Majority	Turnout
2005	N12 Pengkalan Pasir	Hanifa Ahmad (PAS)	7,288	48.18%	Hanafi Mamat (UMNO)	7,422	49.07%	15,450	134	73.00%
2005	N12 Pengkalan Pasir	Hanifa Ahmad (PAS)	7,288	48.18%	Ibrahim Ali (IND)	415	2.74%	15,450	134	73.00%
2008	N12 Pengkalan Pasir	Hanifa Ahmad (PAS)	10,377	56.38%	Hanafi Mamat (UMNO)	8,029	43.62%	18,740	2,348	82.99%
2013	N12 Pengkalan Pasir	Hanifa Ahmad (PAS)	13,398	60.68%	Tuan Anuwa Tuan Mat (UMNO)	8,683	39.32%	22,454	4,715	82.20%
2018	N12 Pengkalan Pasir	Hanifa Ahmad (PAS)	10,143	53.14%	Che Johan Che Pa (UMNO)	5,545	29.06%	19,680	4,598	76.23%
2018	N12 Pengkalan Pasir	Hanifa Ahmad (PAS)	10,143	53.14%	Mohd Sharani Mohd Naim (AMANAH)	2,570	13.47%	19,680	4,598	76.23%
2018	N12 Pengkalan Pasir	Hanifa Ahmad (PAS)	10,143	53.14%	Suharto Mat Nasir (IND)	826	4.33%	19,680	4,598	76.23%

== Honours ==
- Kelantan
  - Knight Commander of the Order of the Life of the Crown of Kelantan (DJMK) – Dato' (2013)
