= Abdul Rahman Daud =

Malaysian politician

Member of the Malaysian Parliament for Pasir Mas
- In office 1978–1982
- Preceded by: Tengku Zaid Tengku Ahmad
- Succeeded by: Wan Ibrahim Wan Abdullah

Personal details
- Born: Abdul Rahman bin Daud Pasir Mas, Kelantan
- Party: UMNO
- Occupation: Politician

Abdul Rahman bin Daud is a politician from UMNO. He was the Member of Parliament for Pasir Mas from 1978 to 1982.

== Election results ==
Parliament of Malaysia
Year	Constituency	Candidate	Votes	Pct	Opponent(s)	Votes	Pct	Ballots cast	Majority	Turnout
1978	Pasir Mas	Abdul Rahman Daud (UMNO)	12,521	55.29%	Zakaria Ismail (PAS)	10,126	44.71%	22,647	2,395	73.12%

== See also ==
- Pasir Mas (federal constituency)
