= 2005 Pengkalan Pasir by-election =

Election in Malaysia

- 27 November 2005

Pengkalan Pasir seat in the Kelantan State Legislative Assembly
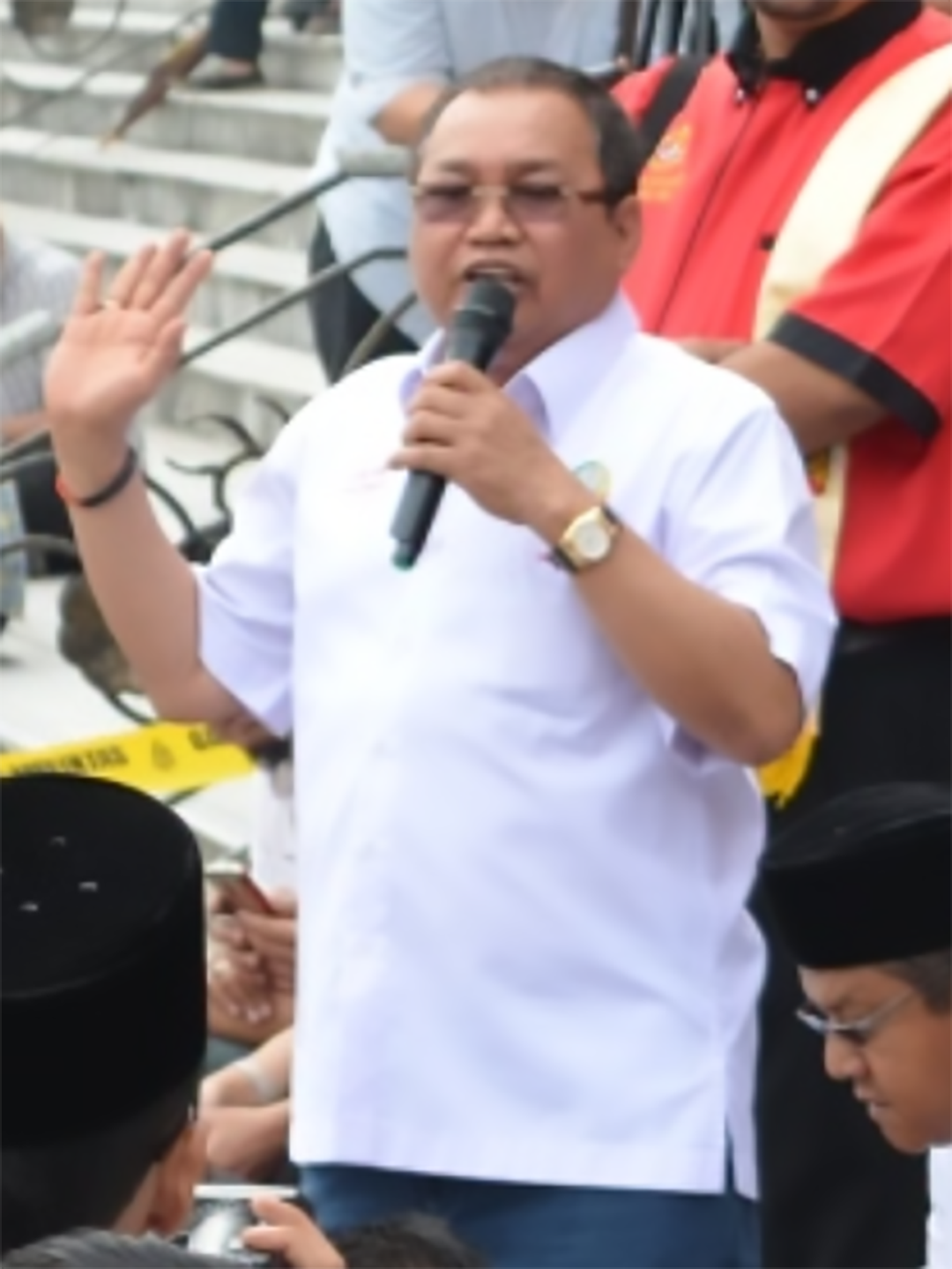
	BN	PAS
Candidate	Hanafi Mamat	Hanifa Ahmad	Ibrahim Ali
Party	BN (UMNO)	PAS	Independent
Popular vote	7,422	7,288	415
Percentage	49.07%	48.19%	2.74%
Pengkalan Pasir assemblyman before election
Wan Abdul Aziz Wan Jaafar
PAS
Elected Pengkalan Pasir assemblyman
Hanafi Mamat
BN (UMNO)

The Pengkalan Pasir by-election was held on 6 December 2005 in the Pengkalan Pasir state assembly constituency of the PAS-governed state of Kelantan, Malaysia. Nominations were held on 27 November 2005, and the election was contested by Hanifa Ahmad of Pan-Malaysian Islamic Party (PAS), Hanafi Mamat of the United Malays National Organisation (UMNO) in the Barisan Nasional (BN) coalition, and Ibrahim Ali, an independent candidate. The by-election was necessitated after the death of the incumbent, Wan Abdul Aziz Wan Jaafar from PAS, on 31 October because of cancer. Wan Abdul Aziz defeated Hanafi by 55 votes in the 2004 general election. In 2005, there are 18,411 eligible voters and 195 registered postal voters; 94.8% Malay and 5.2% Chinese in Pengkalan Pasir.

The eventual winner was Hanafi, who was initially announced to have won with a majority of 129 votes. This thin margin entitled Hanifa to a recount the following day, but the outcome was unaltered — Hanafi won 7,422 votes, defeating Hanifa, who polled 7,288 votes, by a margin of 134 votes. Ibrahim won 415 votes, losing his deposit. The outcome of the election has left the Kelantan state government in a precarious position, as a single defecting PAS member of the state assembly would result in Barisan Nasional forming the state government. As a result, the by-election campaign was fraught with many offers to assemblymen on both sides of gifts or government positions in return for defecting. There were also allegations of phantom voters from PAS, with several buses carrying suspected phantom voters being stopped by PAS supporters on election day.

== Background ==
Hanafi Mamat was born in Kg Padang Tokla Pasir Mas Kelantan. He attended Sultan Ibrahim Primary School till 1966 and proceeded to Sultan Ibrahim Secondary School in 1967. After graduating from University of East London (formerly known North East London Polytechnic) he joined the Survey and Mapping Department Malaysia serving as a district surveyor and assistant director in the states of Pahang, Terengganu and Kelantan. He resigned from government service in 1990 to contest for the Pasir Mas Parliamentary seat for Barisan Nasional (BN) but lost. Then, he was UMNO youth division chief and the UMNO Youth Malaysia EXCO.

In the 2004 general election, Barisan Nasional (BN) won 21 out of 45 seats in the Kelantan state assembly, a major setback for PAS, whose stronghold had always been Kelantan. PAS now governed the state with a thin three-seat majority in the state assembly. Wan Abdul Aziz's passing reduced that majority to two, and if BN wins the seat, PAS will govern by a one-seat majority.

However, BN's history of by-elections in Kelantan has not been favourable — of the 15 by-elections held there, BN has won only once. Out of the 11 elections held for the Pengkalan Pasir (formerly known as Bandar Pasir Mas) seat, BN won thrice — in the 1978, 1982 and 1986 general elections. In the 2004 general election, Wan Abdul Aziz defeated Hanafi by 55 votes, making the seat one of the most contested in the nation.

Before nominations commenced, the UMNO-owned New Straits Times newspaper noted that both parties had already eagerly begun campaigning, with banners and posters erected. Although this is technically illegal, neither side has bothered to condemn this practice. The only period of time where it is legal to campaign is between nomination day and polling day — slightly more than a week.

Both parties selected their candidates internally as is the norm, without primary elections, with Prime Minister Abdullah Ahmad Badawi of UMNO reportedly having decided on the BN candidate. The candidates' identities were announced on the eve of nomination day. However, it was not known if Ibrahim Ali would contest the seat, as although he had expressed interest, none of the major newspapers in Malaysia (most of which are owned by parties in BN) confirmed rumours that he would run. Ibrahim was formerly a Member of Parliament for the seat of Pasir Mas in Kelantan, and unsuccessfully ran for the seat in the 2004 general election. He was also a UMNO division chief before leaving the party.

Hanifa was formerly the Group Chief Executive of the Kelantan State Economic Development Corporation and is currently a member of the PAS Pasir Mas division committee, while Hanafi is the Vice President of the Malaysian Association of Authorised Land Surveyors and the UMNO Pasir Mas deputy division chief.

Due to the wafer-thin majority of PAS in the state assembly, there was much jockeying among BN, UMNO specifically, to see if a majority could be gained in the state assembly, whether by turning PAS assemblymen to the BN side or by forcing the dissolution of the assembly and holding fresh elections. On 13 November, BN Kelantan chairman Annuar Musa announced his intent to get Kelantan Chief Minister Nik Aziz Nik Mat of PAS to seek royal consent to dissolve the state assembly if PAS lost so they could receive a clear mandate from the voters. PAS president Abdul Hadi Awang then said the party would not allow UMNO or BN to dictate terms to it.

Kelantan state executive councillor Husam Musa then challenged all 21 BN assemblymen to resign to allow fresh elections to be held. Annuar took Husam up on his challenge, saying they would resign on 1 December to pave the way for snap elections. Deputy Prime Minister, Najib Razak, then weighed in, saying all 44 assemblymen should resign, and not just the 21 from BN. Nik Aziz said he would "never entertain" such a request. Later the Election Commission deputy chairman Wan Ahmad Wan Omar said anyone who resigned would waive their rights to run in an election for the next five years unless the sultan of Kelantan dissolved the assembly. Finally, Prime Minister Abdullah told both sides to stop calling for each other's resignation, as the Election Commission had made it clear that this would not allow the incumbents to contest.

Both sides also attempted to woo assemblymen from the other party, with UMNO offering high-ranking posts in the state government to the first assemblymen to defect from PAS. PAS reciprocated this with a similar offer.

The election is widely viewed as a referendum on the policies of both parties. Conservative leaders in PAS, which has the avowed goal of establishing Malaysia as an Islamic theocracy, were rejected in favour of more liberal ones in the recent party elections, while political pundits see the election as a possible bellwether on the people's views of Abdullah's and BN's policies. It is also viewed as an indicator of how people receive ousted Deputy Prime Minister Anwar Ibrahim, formerly of UMNO but now an advisor of Parti Keadilan Rakyat (PKR) and actively campaigning for PAS.

== Nominations ==
As expected, Hanafi, Hanifa and Ibrahim all submitted their nominations in the appropriate manner between 9 and 10am on nomination day, 27 November. Nominations closed at 10am. However, to the surprise of bystanders, two people later appeared to file their nomination papers and run as independent candidates.

Mohamad Suji @ Ahmad Awang, a former religious teacher, was the first to file his papers, but had them rejected by the Election Commission for paying the nomination fee of RM5,000 with a crossed cheque instead of cash or a bank draft. The second attempted independent candidate was Fauziah Gani, a businesswoman, who also had her papers rejected for paying with a cheque.

After nominations closed, PAS filed an objection with the Election Commission, arguing that Hanafi was forbidden to run under the Universities and University Colleges Act 1975; Hanafi is a PhD candidate at Universiti Teknologi Malaysia (UTM), and the act forbids all undergraduate and post-graduate students from being involved in any political activities whatsoever. However, the Electoral Commission refused to entertain the objection. The Election Commission's chairman, Abdul Rashid Abdul Rahman, said, "That objection is too trivial, democracy must be maintained... anyone who is qualified may run."

After nominations closed, Hanafi, Hanifa and Ibrahim appeared together holding hands to greet their supporters. Ibrahim requested that "BN and PAS should be gentlemen and refrain from using the Federal and State Government machinery to campaign for them," while Hanifa stated "The three-cornered fight will benefit us." Hanafi expressed confidence that the 18,411 voters in the constituency would choose BN over PAS, who had expressed similar worries as Ibrahim about the Federal Government being used to campaign for BN.

== Election day ==
On the morning of election day before the polls opened, PAS supporters held up buses they suspected of ferrying phantom voters to polling stations. The buses were diverted to a police station, where the identities of their passengers were ascertained. It was later announced that they were legitimate voters but registered in other constituencies, and had been brought in by UMNO for some last-minute campaigning.

Both UMNO and PAS organised transportation for voters, with UMNO going as far as to pay for the expenses of bringing home out-of-state voters, including those living overseas. Polls opened at 9am and closed at 5pm, and in the evening Hanafi was declared the victor. However, as his margin of victory, 129 votes with 7,419 votes to Hanifa's 7,290, was smaller than 2%, election rules gave PAS the right to demand a recount the following day. The recount was held at 10am, and confirmed the result; however, Hanafi's margin was increased to 139, with the recount giving him 7,422 votes to Hanifa's 7,288. The turnout for the election was 83.04%, higher than the 77.6% seen in the previous year's general election.

The election result was seen as crushing for Ibrahim's political career, and also possibly for Anwar's as well. Anwar had lent heavy support to PAS, despite his proclaimed misgivings about its goal of establishing Malaysia as an Islamic state. PAS, which had been expecting the election to act as a bellwether on how the electorate would respond to its internal reforms, was seen by analysts as now having trouble evaluating its new policies due to the election's indeterminate results.

Although both Anwar and Ibrahim had large audiences at speeches (ceramah) they held, where they criticised, among others, Abdullah's Islam Hadhari and the recent lock-up detainee abuse scandal, on polling day, the voters appeared to desert PAS and Ibrahim. Some suggested this could be due to most of the attendees at the speeches not being voters in the constituency, while others argued that voters were swayed by BN's promises of development.

PAS declared BN had won by using illegal tactics, and declared it would file a report with the Election Commission (EC). Some cynical members of the independent media argued that the postal ballots had been stuffed, and asked how there could be 212 postal voters when there were only 195 registered postal voters, suggesting BN had won using underhanded tactics.

The Malaysian Chinese Association (MCA), a key member of the Barisan Nasional, claimed they had succeeded at winning the Chinese vote in the constituency, with supposedly 95% of the 800 Chinese voters there voting for BN. "We even persuaded a few Chinese voters who were planning to go on holiday to China to postpone their trip ... to vote on Tuesday," said one MCA official. He also said 80 of 130 Chinese voters living outside the constituency returned to cast their votes.

== Election results ==
Kelantan state by-election, 6 December 2005: Pengkalan Pasir The by-election was called due to the death of incumbent, Wan Abdul Aziz Wan Jaafar.
Party	Candidate	Votes	%	∆%
BN	Hanafi Mamat	7,422	49.07	▼0.73
PAS	Hanifa Ahmad	7,288	48.19	▼2.01
Independent	Ibrahim Ali	415	2.74	N/A
Total valid votes		15,125	100.00	
Total rejected ballots		325		
Unreturned ballots		0		
Turnout		15,450	73.00	
Registered electors		18,411		
Majority		134	0.88	
BN gain from PAS		Swing		?
