= Pasir Mas (federal constituency) =

Federal constituency of Kelantan, Malaysia

Pasir Mas (P022)
Kelantan constituency

Federal constituency
- Legislature: Dewan Rakyat
- MP: Ahmad Fadhli Shaari; PN
- Constituency created: 1955
- Constituency abolished: 1959
- Constituency re-created: 1974
- First contested: 1955
- Last contested: 2022

Demographics
- Population (2020): 113,476
- Electors (2023): 94,755
- Area (km²): 176
- Pop. density (per km²): 644.8

Pasir Mas is a federal constituency in Pasir Mas District, Kelantan, Malaysia, that has been represented in the Dewan Rakyat since 1955 to 1959 and 1974 to present. Pasir Mas is between Rantau Panjang and Kota Bharu.

The federal constituency was created in the 1955 redistribution and is mandated to return a single member to the Dewan Rakyat under the first past the post voting system.

== Demographics ==
https://live.chinapress.com.my/ge15/parliament/KELANTAN

Ethnic breakdown of Pasir Mas's electorate as of 2022
1. Malay (99.5%)
2. Chinese (0.20%)
3. Other ethnicities (0.30%)
4. Indian (0.00%)

As of 2020, Pasir Mas has a population of 113,476 people.

Age breakdown of Pasir Mas's electorate as of 2022
1. 18-20 (6.53%)
2. 21-29 (22.7%)
3. 30-39 (23.4%)
4. 40-49 (16.9%)
5. 50-59 (13.4%)
6. 60-69 (9.75%)
7. 70-79 (5.04%)
8. 80-89 (1.71%)
9. above 90 (0.53%)
Gender breakdown of Pasir Mas's electorate as of 2022
1. Male (49.5%)
2. Female (50.5%)

== History ==
=== Polling districts ===
According to the federal gazette issued on 18 July 2023, the Pasir Mas constituency is divided into 35 polling districts.

State constituency	Polling Districts	Code	Location
Tendong (N11）	Pangkal Kala	022/11/01	SK Pangkal Kota
Tendong (N11）	Bechah Semak	022/11/02	SK Penggu
Tendong (N11）	Teliar	022/11/03	SMK Bunut Susu
Tendong (N11）	Bechah Menerong	022/11/04	SK Bunut Susu
Tendong (N11）	Bunut Susu	022/11/05	SK Bunut Susu
Tendong (N11）	Bechah Durian	022/11/06	SK Bechah Durian
Tendong (N11）	Padang Embon	022/11/07	SMA (Arab) Al-Ulum
Tendong (N11）	Kampung Paloh	022/11/08	SMK Tendong
Tendong (N11）	Hutan Chengal	022/11/09	Kolej Vokesional Pasir Mas
Tendong (N11）	Kubang Sepat	022/11/10	SK Tanjong Bunga
Tendong (N11）	Kampung Hutan Pasir	022/11/11	SMK Tanjong Bunga
Tendong (N11）	Tendong	022/11/12	SK Othman Talib (1)
Tendong (N11）	Kedondong	022/11/13	SMK Kedondong
Tendong (N11）	Kampung Chat	022/11/14	SK Gelang Mas
Pengkalan Pasir (N12）	Sakar	022/12/01	SK Mekasar
Pengkalan Pasir (N12）	Kubang Badak	022/12/02	SMK Kampung Dangar
Pengkalan Pasir (N12）	Kubang Bemban	022/12/03	SMK Kubang Bemban
Pengkalan Pasir (N12）	Kampung Bharu	022/12/04	SMK Sultan Ibrahim (2)
Pengkalan Pasir (N12）	Kampung Dangar	022/12/05	SK Sultan Ibrahim (3)
Pengkalan Pasir (N12）	Pengkalan Pasir	022/12/06	SK Dato' Abdul Hamid (2)
Pengkalan Pasir (N12）	Bandar Pasir Mas	022/12/07	SK Dato' Abdul Hamid (1)
Pengkalan Pasir (N12）	Slow Machang	022/12/08	SK Tanjong Chenak
Pengkalan Pasir (N12）	Kasa	022/12/09	SK Mekasar
Meranti（N13）	Banggol Chicha	022/13/01	SK Banggol Chicha
Meranti（N13）	Meranti	022/13/02	SK Meranti
Meranti（N13）	Bakong	022/13/03	SK Bakong
Meranti（N13）	Meranti Kechil	022/13/04	SMK Meranti
Meranti（N13）	Pohon Buloh	022/13/05	SMU (A) Ismailiah Binjai Manis
Meranti（N13）	Kampung Lalang	022/13/06	SK Bayu Lalang
Meranti（N13）	Pohon Tanjong	022/13/07	SK Kedai Tanjong
Meranti（N13）	Kampung Siram	022/13/08	SMU (A) Al-Falah Siram
Meranti（N13）	Jejawi	022/13/09	SMU (A) Diniah
Meranti（N13）	Banggol Setol	022/13/10	SMU (A) Khairiah Banggol Setol
Meranti（N13）	Tok Sangkut	022/13/11	SK Tok Sangkut
Meranti（N13）	Tasek Berangan	022/13/12	SMU (A) Rahmaniah Repek

=== Representation history ===
Members of Parliament for Pasir Mas
Parliament	No	Years	Member	Party	Vote Share
Constituency created					
Federal Legislative Council
1st		1955–1959	Tengku Ahmad Tengku Abdul Ja'afar (تڠكو أحمد تڠكو عبدالجعفر)	Alliance (UMNO)	20,963; 73.70%
Constituency abolished, split into Pasir Mas Hilir and Pasir Mas Hulu
Parliament of Malaysia
Constituency re-created, from Pasir Mas Hilir and Tumpat
4th	P018	1974–1978	Tengku Zaid Tengku Ahmad (تڠكو زيد تڠكو أحمد)	BN (PAS)	15,927; 80.95%
5th	P018	1978–1982	Abdul Rahman Daud (عبدالرحمن داود)	BN (UMNO)	12,521; 55.29%
6th	P018	1982–1986	Wan Ibrahim Wan Abdullah (وان إبراهيم وان عبدالله)	PAS	14,574; 51.71%
7th	P020	1986–1990	Ibrahim Ali (إبراهيم علي)	BN (UMNO)	15,711; 56.90%
8th	P020	1990–1991	Ibrahim Ali (إبراهيم علي)	S46	20,066; 65.06%
8th	P020	1991–1995	Ibrahim Ali (إبراهيم علي)	BN (UMNO)	20,066; 65.06%
9th	P022	1995–1999	Zainuddin Mohamad Nor (زين الدين محمد نور)	S46	19,394; 54.52%
10th	P022	1999–2004	Ismail Noh (إسماعيل نوح)	BA (PAS)	23,967; 60.89%
11th	P022	2004–2008	Ismail Noh (إسماعيل نوح)	PAS	17,526; 43.82%
12th	P022	2008	Ibrahim Ali (إبراهيم علي)	PR (PAS)	28,673; 59.30%
12th	P022	2008–2013	Ibrahim Ali (إبراهيم علي)	Independent	28,673; 59.30%
13th	P022	2013–2018	Nik Mohamad Abduh Nik Abdul Aziz (نئ محمد عبده نئ عبدالعزيز)	PR (PAS)	33,431; 56.84%
14th	P022	2018–2020	Ahmad Fadhli Shaari (أحمد فضلي شعاري)	PAS	28,080; 52.44%
14th	P022	2020–2022	Ahmad Fadhli Shaari (أحمد فضلي شعاري)	PN (PAS)	28,080; 52.44%
15th	P022	2022–present	Ahmad Fadhli Shaari (أحمد فضلي شعاري)	PN (PAS)	44,444; 68.21%

=== State constituency ===
Parliamentary constituency	State constituency						
Parliamentary constituency	1955–1959*	1959–1974	1974–1986	1986–1995	1995–2004	2004–2018	2018–present
Pasir Mas			Bandar Pasir Mas				
Pasir Mas						Chetok	
Pasir Mas			Meranti				Meranti
Pasir Mas	Pasir Mas Selatan						
Pasir Mas	Pasir Mas Tengah						
Pasir Mas	Pasir Mas Utara						
Pasir Mas				Pengkalan Pasir			
Pasir Mas			Tendong				
Pasir Mas					Wakaf Bharu		

=== Historical boundaries ===
State Constituency	Area				
State Constituency	1974	1984	1994	2003	2018
Bandar Pasir Mas	Kampung Banggol Chicha; Kasar; Kedai Pohon Buloh; Meranti; Pasir Mas				
Chetok				Chetok; Chicha Tinggi; Gabus; Perupok; To Uban	
Meranti	Gelang Mas; Kampung Bakong; Kampung Salah; Kampung Terusan; Meranti	Cabang Empat; Gelang Mas; Kampung Bakong; Kampung Salah; Meranti			Banggol Kuin; Kampung Bakong; Kampung Guntong; Kampung Terusan; Meranti
Pengkalan Pasir		Kampung Banggol Chicha; Kampung Belukar; Kampung Kubang Bemban; Kasar; Pasir Mas	Banggol Kuin; Kampung Pauh; Kampung Repek; Pasir Mas; Pengkalan Pasir		Kampung Pauh; Kasar; Kedai Pohon Buloh; Pasir Mas; Pengkalan Pasir
Tendong	Bunut Susu; Chabang Empat; Kampung Kayu Tinggi; Kampung Tok Buak; Tendong	Bechah Durian; Bunut Susu; Hutan Chengal; Pangkal Kota; Tendong			
Wakaf Bharu			Cabang Empat; Kampung Bendang Morak; Kampung Kebakat; Kampung Kutan; Wakaf Bharu		

=== Current state assembly members ===
No.	State Constituency	Member	Coalition (Party)
N11	Tendong	Rozi Muhamad	PN (PAS)
N12	Pengkalan Pasir	Mohd Nasriff Daud	PN (PAS)
N13	Meranti	Mohd. Nassuruddin Daud	PN (PAS)

=== Local governments & postcodes ===
No.	State Constituency	Local Government	Postcode
N11	Tendong	Pasir Mas District Council	17000, 17010, 17020, 17030 Pasir Mas; 17200 Rantau Panjang
N12	Pengkalan Pasir	Pasir Mas District Council	17000, 17010, 17020, 17030 Pasir Mas; 17200 Rantau Panjang
N13	Meranti	Pasir Mas District Council	17000, 17010, 17020, 17030 Pasir Mas; 17200 Rantau Panjang

== Election results ==
Malaysian general election, 2022
Party	Candidate	Votes	%	∆%
PAS	Ahmad Fadhli Shaari	44,444	68.21	▲15.77
BN	Abdul Ghani Harun	13,727	21.07	▼6.95
PH	Husam Musa	6,439	9.88	▲9.88
PUTRA	Nasrul Ali Hassan Abdul Latif	543	0.83	▲0.83
Total valid votes		65,153	100.00	
Total rejected ballots		819		
Unreturned ballots		173		
Turnout		66,145	68.91	▼8.76
Registered electors		94,544		
Majority		30,717	47.14	▲22.72
PAS hold		Swing		
Source(s) https://lom.agc.gov.my/ilims/upload/portal/akta/outputp/1753266/PUB%20607%20(2022).pdf

Malaysian general election, 2018
Party	Candidate	Votes	%	∆%
PAS	Ahmad Fadhli Shaari	28,080	52.44	▼4.40
BN	Nor Azmawi Ab Rahman	15,005	28.02	▼12.68
Independent	Ibrahim Ali	5,373	10.03	▼33.13
PKR	Che Ujang Che Daud	5,093	9.51	▲9.51
Total valid votes		53,551	100.00	
Total rejected ballots		1,232		
Unreturned ballots		536		
Turnout		55,319	77.67	▼5.94
Registered electors		71,222		
Majority		13,075	24.42	▲10.74
PAS hold		Swing		
Source(s) "His Majesty's Government Gazette - Notice of Contested Election, Parliament for the State of Kelantan [P.U. (B) 234/2018]" (PDF). Attorney General's Chambers of Malaysia. 3 May 2018. "Federal Government Gazette - Results of Contested Election and Statements of the Poll after the Official Addition of Votes, Parliamentary Constituencies for the State of Kelantan [P.U. (B) 308/2018]" (PDF). Attorney General's Chambers of Malaysia. 28 May 2018.

Malaysian general election, 2013
Party	Candidate	Votes	%	∆%
PAS	Nik Mohamad Abduh Nik Abdul Aziz	33,431	56.84	▼2.46
Independent	Ibrahim Ali	25,384	43.16	▲43.16
Total valid votes		58,815	100.00	
Total rejected ballots		1,115		
Unreturned ballots		238		
Turnout		60,168	83.61	▲0.87
Registered electors		71,965		
Majority		8,047	13.68	▼4.92
PAS hold		Swing		
Source(s) "Federal Government Gazette - Notice of Contested Election, Parliament for the State of Kelantan [P.U. (B) 171/2013]" (PDF). Attorney General's Chambers of Malaysia. 26 April 2013. "Federal Government Gazette - Results of Contested Election and Statements of the Poll after the Official Addition of Votes, Parliamentary Constituencies for the State of Kelantan [P.U. (B) 212/2013]" (PDF). Attorney General's Chambers of Malaysia. 22 May 2013. Archived from the original (PDF) on 29 December 2019.

Malaysian general election, 2008
Party	Candidate	Votes	%	∆%
PAS	Ibrahim Ali	28,673	59.30	▲15.48
BN	Ahmad Rosdi Mahmad	19,682	40.70	▲0.01
Total valid votes		48,355	100.00	
Total rejected ballots		864		
Unreturned ballots		125		
Turnout		49,344	82.74	▲4.30
Registered electors		59,640		
Majority		8,991	18.60	▲15.47
PAS hold		Swing		

Malaysian general election, 2004
Party	Candidate	Votes	%	∆%
PAS	Ismail Noh	17,526	43.82	▼17.07
BN	Abdul Rahim Abdul Rahman	16,275	40.69	▲1.58
Independent	Ibrahim Ali	6,198	15.50	▲15.50
Total valid votes		39,999	100.00	
Total rejected ballots		1,396		
Unreturned ballots		0		
Turnout		41,395	78.44	▲0.36
Registered electors		52,772		
Majority		1,251	3.13	▼18.65
PAS hold		Swing		

Malaysian general election, 1999
Party	Candidate	Votes	%	∆%
PAS	Ismail Noh	23,967	60.89	▲60.89
BN	Ibrahim Ali	15,392	39.11	▼6.37
Total valid votes		39,359	100.00	
Total rejected ballots		549		
Unreturned ballots		41		
Turnout		39,949	78.08	▼8.44
Registered electors		51,164		
Majority		8,575	21.78	▲12.74
PAS gain from S46		Swing		?

Malaysian general election, 1995
Party	Candidate	Votes	%	∆%
S46	Zainuddin Mohamad Nor	19,394	54.52	▼10.54
BN	Ibrahim Ali	16,178	45.48	▲10.54
Total valid votes		35,572	100.00	
Total rejected ballots		1,154		
Unreturned ballots		265		
Turnout		36,991	86.52	▲10.92
Registered electors		42,754		
Majority		3,216	9.04	▼21.08
S46 hold		Swing		

Malaysian general election, 1990
Party	Candidate	Votes	%	∆%
S46	Ibrahim Ali	20,066	65.06	▲65.06
BN	Hanafi Mamat	10,776	34.94	▼21.96
Total valid votes		30,842	100.00	
Total rejected ballots		837		
Unreturned ballots		0		
Turnout		31,679	75.60	▲1.75
Registered electors		41,901		
Majority		9,290	30.12	▲16.32
S46 gain from BN		Swing		?

Malaysian general election, 1986
Party	Candidate	Votes	%	∆%
BN	Ibrahim Ali	15,711	56.90	▲8.61
PAS	Zakaria Ismail	11,903	43.10	▼8.61
Total valid votes		27,614	100.00	
Total rejected ballots		761		
Unreturned ballots		0		
Turnout		28,375	73.85	▲0.36
Registered electors		38,423		
Majority		3,808	13.80	▲10.38
BN gain from PAS		Swing		?

Malaysian general election, 1982
Party	Candidate	Votes	%	∆%
PAS	Wan Ibrahim Wan Abdullah	14,574	51.71	▲7.00
BN	Abdul Rahman Daud	13,610	48.29	▼7.00
Total valid votes		28,184	100.00	
Total rejected ballots		1,156		
Unreturned ballots		0		
Turnout		29,340	78.49	▲4.63
Registered electors		37,382		
Majority		964	3.42	▼7.16
PAS gain from BN		Swing		?

Malaysian general election, 1978
Party	Candidate	Votes	%	∆%
BN	Abdul Rahman Daud	12,521	55.29	▼25.66
PAS	Zakaria Ismail	10,126	44.71	▲44.71
Total valid votes		22,647	100.00	
Total rejected ballots		228		
Unreturned ballots		0		
Turnout		22,875	73.86	▲10.45
Registered electors		30,972		
Majority		2,395	10.58	▼51.32
BN hold		Swing		

Malaysian general election, 1974
Party	Candidate	Votes	%	∆%
BN	Tengku Zaid Tengku Ahmad	15,927	80.95	
Independent	Ahmad Fakaruddin Abdullah	3,747	19.05	
Total valid votes		19,674	100.00	
Total rejected ballots		1,047		
Unreturned ballots		0		
Turnout		20,721	63.41	
Registered electors		32,680		
Majority		12,180	61.90	
BN hold		Swing		

Malayan general election, 1955
Party	Candidate	Votes	%
Alliance	Tengku Ahmad Abd Ja'afar	20,963	73.70
PMIP	Tuan Mokhtar	7,507	26.30
Total valid votes		28,443	100.00
Total rejected ballots			
Unreturned ballots			
Turnout		28,443	54.60
Registered electors		52,093	
Majority		13,456	47.40
This was a new constituency created.
Source(s): The Straits Times.
