= Pasir Mas District =

Pasir Mas District Pasey Mah (Kelantan–Pattani Malay)
- District of Kelantan
- Jajahan Pasir Mas
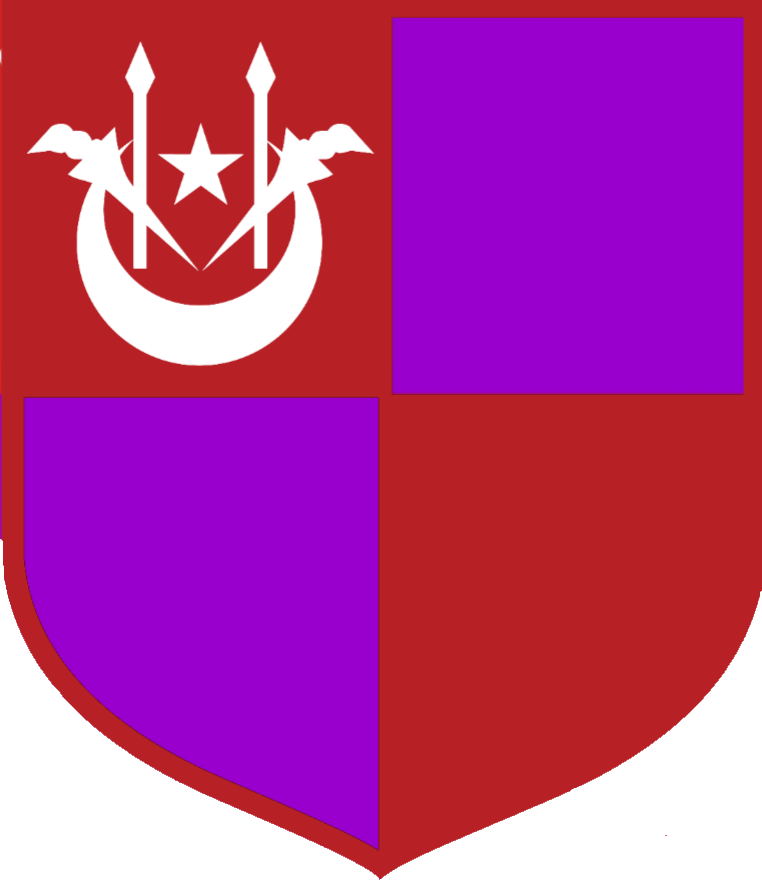
- Flag Coat of arms

- Location of Pasir Mas District in Kelantan
- Interactive map of Pasir Mas District
- Location of Pasir Mas District in Malaysia
- Coordinates: 6°2′N 102°8′E
- Country: Malaysia
- State: Kelantan
- Seat: Pasir Mas
- Local area government(s): Pasir Mas District Council

Government
  - District officer: Hazmi Bin Abdul Hamid
  - Administrative office: Pasir Mas District and Land Office

Area
  - Total: 570 km^{2} (220 sq mi)

Population (2022)
  - Total: 233,400
  - Density: 410/km^{2} (1,100/sq mi)
- Time zone: UTC+8 (MST)
  - Summer (DST): UTC+8 (Not observed)
- Postcode: 17xxx
- Calling code: +6-09
- Vehicle registration plates: D

Pasir Mas District (Kelantanese: Jajahey Pasey Mah) is a district (jajahan) in Kelantan, Malaysia. The district covers an area of 614.15 square kilometers and is bordered by the districts of Tumpat District to the north, Tanah Merah District to the south, Kota Bharu District to the east, and the Thai district of Su-ngai Kolok (Malay: Sungai Golok) to the west.

Due to its geographical location, it acts as the main gateway of the East Coast of Malaysia to Thailand and is also traversed by major road transport routes from the West Coast to the state capital of Kota Bharu.

The district of Pasir Mas was originally part of the district of Kota Bharu. In 1918, the town of Pasir Mas and its surrounding areas were separated from Kota Bharu and granted its own local government. The seat of this district is the town of Pasir Mas.

== Transportation ==
=== Rail ===
A railway station operated by Keretapi Tanah Melayu (KTM) is located here. The station is part of KTM Intercity's Rantau Panjang Line and interchanges with the East Coast Line which ends at the Tumpat railway station.

The nightly Ekspres Timuran from Johor Bahru usually reaches here at around 9:00 am. Ekspres Wau departs at 6:30 pm for the 13-hour journey to KL Sentral, Kuala Lumpur. The Rantau Panjang Line continues towards north at Rantau Panjang railway station at the border town of Rantau Panjang and links to the Southern Line of the State Railway of Thailand.

A new railway station which replaced the original one at the same location was completed in July 2008. The reasonable fare attracts small-traders, who would board here with various goods - usually foodstuff from Rantau Panjang - to transport to the interiors. The trains' scheduled arrivals and departures often create traffic jams in the town several times daily. A carriageway connecting Lemal and Kubang Panjang over the railway track has been built to overcome this. Trains no longer stop at the hamlet station of Tok Uban along the way to Tanah Merah.

=== Bus ===
From Pasir Mas town, it is possible to go to any state capital in Peninsular Malaysia without having to change buses. However, buses departing from these state capitals with Kota Bharu as the final destination might not pass through Pasir Mas. But those with Rantau Panjang as the final destination, will.

The most popular inter-state bus company is Transnasional, which is majority-owned by a federal government agency. Syarikat Kenderaan Melayu Kelantan (SKMK) has a monopoly of inter-district and intra-district bus routes. There are direct buses to the main towns of Kota Bharu, Rantau Panjang and Tanah Merah and vice versa; which depart every 30 minutes from 7:00 am to 6:30 pm. The bus station is at the centre of the town; about 100 metres from the train station.

=== Air ===
The nearest airport to the district is Sultan Ismail Petra Airport in Kota Bharu which is located 29 km (18 mi) north east of Pasir Mas town centre.

== Population ==
Historical population
Year	Pop.	±%
1991	150,035	—
2000	162,312	+8.2%
2010	180,878	+11.4%
2020	230,424	+27.4%

Map of Pasir Mas District

Pasir Mas as of 2010 Census, it has a population of 189,292 people.

Ranking Population of Jajahan Pasir Mas.

Rank	Daerah	Population 2000
1	Rantau Panjang	23,714
2	Kubang Gadong	22,931
3	Pasir Mas	21,681
4	Kangkong	16,488
5	Gual Periok	15,326
6	Bunut Susu	15,008
7	Kubang Sepat	14,484
8	Chetok	12,576
9	Lemal	10,753
10	Alor Pasir	9,351

== Federal Parliament and State Assembly Seats ==
List of LMS district representatives in the Federal Parliament (Dewan Rakyat)

Parliament	Seat Name	Member of Parliament	Party
P22	Pasir Mas	Ahmad Fadhli Mohd Shaari	Perikatan Nasional (PAS)
P23	Rantau Panjang	Siti Zailah Mohd Yusoff	Perikatan Nasional (PAS)

List of LMS district representatives in the State Legislative Assembly of Kelantan

Parliament	State	Seat Name	State Assemblyman	Party
P22	N11	Tendong	Rozi Mohamad	Perikatan Nasional (PAS)
P22	N12	Pengkalan Pasir	Hanifa Ahmad	Perikatan Nasional (PAS)
P22	N13	Meranti	Mohd. Nassuruddin Daud	Perikatan Nasional (PAS)
P23	N14	Chetok	Zuraidin Abdullah	Perikatan Nasional (PAS)
P23	N15	Gual Periok	Mohamad Awang	Perikatan Nasional (PAS)
P23	N16	Apam Putra	Abdul Rasul Mohamed	Perikatan Nasional (PAS)

== Education ==
Several types of schools can be found in Pasir Mas. Among the schools in Pasir Mas are

- Sekolah Menengah Kebangsaan Baroh Pial, Kampung Bukit Tandak, 17200 Rantau Panjang
- Sekolah Menengah Kebangsaan Bunut Susu, Kampung Bunut Susu, 17020 Pasir Mas
- Sekolah Menengah Kebangsaan Chetok, Kampung Sungai Keladi, 17060 Pasir Mas
- Sekolah Menengah Kebangsaan Gual Periok, Gual Periok, 17200 Rantau Panjang
- Sekolah Menengah Kebangsaan Kangkong, Wakil Pos Kangkong, 17040 Pasir Mas
- Sekolah Menengah Kebangsaan Kedondong, Kampung Kedondong, 17010 Pasir Mas
- Sekolah Menengah Kebangsaan Meranti, Kampung Meranti, 17010 Pasir Mas
- Sekolah Menengah Kebangsaan Pasir Mas, Jalan Masjid, 17000 Pasir Mas
- Sekolah Menengah Kebangsaan Rantau Panjang, Pekan Rantau Panjang, 17200 Rantau Panjang
- Sekolah Menengah Kebangsaan Sultan Ibrahim (1), Jalan Meranti, 17000 Pasir Mas
- Sekolah Menengah Kebangsaan Sultan Ibrahim (2), Jalan Hospital, 17000 Pasir Mas
- Sekolah Menengah Kebangsaan Tendong, Tendong, 17030 Pasir Mas
- Sekolah Menengah Kebangsaan Tiang Chandi, Repek, 17070 Pasir Mas
- Sekolah Menengah Kebangsaan Tengku Panglima Raja, Km 5, Jalan Pasir Mas - Tanah Merah, Lemal, 17000 Pasir Mas
- Sekolah Menengah Kebangsaan To' Uban, To' Uban, 17050 Pasir Mas
- Sekolah Menengah Kebangsaan Teknik Pasir Mas, Jalan Tendong - Bunut Susu, 17020 Pasir Mas
- Sekolah Menengah Kebangsaan Kampung Dangar, Jalan Kubang Badak, 17000 Pasir Mas
- Sekolah Menengah Kebangsaan Kubang Bemban, Km 2, Jalan Pasir Mas - Meranti, 17000 Pasir Mas
