= Gerakan Tanah Air =

Political coalition in Malaysia

Homeland Movement ݢراقن تانه اءير
- Malay name: Gerakan Tanah Air
- Abbreviation: GTA
- Founder: Mahathir Mohamad
- Founded: 4 August 2022
- Registered: 1 September 2022
- Ideology: Islamism; Ketuanan Melayu; Religious nationalism Islamic conservatism Mahathirism; Right-wing populism
- Political position: Right-wing to far-right
- Religion: Sunni Islam
- Slogan: Malaysia Unggul dan Bermaruah; Malaysia, eminent and honourable
- Dewan Negara seats: 0 / 70
- Parliamentary seats: 0 / 222
- State Legislative Assemblies: 0 / 607
- State Chief Ministers: 0 / 13

Website
- https://tanahairku.my

Gerakan Tanah Air (GTA, Homeland Movement or Homeland Party) is an alliance of Malay political parties, founded in August 2022 by former Prime Minister of Malaysia Mahathir Mohamad.

Mahathir had announced during the coalition's founding that GTA will contest in the next Malaysian general election against the incumbent ruling coalition Barisan Nasional. On 6 September 2022, the coalition submitted registration documents to the Registrar of Societies (RoS) to apply for registration. The coalition failed to win any parliament seat in the 2022 General Election.

== History ==
On 4 August 2022, PEJUANG Chairman Mahathir Mohamad announced launch of Gerakan Tanah Air (GTA) coalition which aims to keep the country safe and stable by reducing the current gap between races. He said, it does not mean that the movement is racist but rather it is to focus against a Malay party that has gone astray at the moment. The basis of the establishment of the Homeland Movement was not to seize the property of the non-Malay community or prevent them from trying to get wealth, but rather it sought to correct the economy of the Malay community. GTA comprises four parties – PEJUANG, Parti Bumiputera Perkasa Malaysia (Putra), Barisan Jemaah Islamiah Se-Malaysia (Berjasa) and the Parti Perikatan India Muslim Nasional (Iman).

On 23 September 2022, Gerakan Tanah Air's (GTA) application to register as an official political party coalition has received preliminary approval from the Registrar of Society (RoS).

On 2 November 2022, Gerakan Tanah Air's (GTA) announced the 121 Parliamentary candidates who will compete to represent the movement in the 15th General Election (GE-15). However, GTA failed to win all 121 Parliamentary chair.

On 14 January 2023, PEJUANG left GTA. PEJUANG President Mukhriz Mahathir said PEJUANG need focus on strengthening the party before adding value to any coalition. The decision was made after taking into account the views of the representatives in the second PEJUANG General Assembly, following the party's heavy defeat in the past 15th General Election (GE15). However, Mukhriz said PEJUANG took the stance of remaining open to hold any negotiations with any existing political coalition in the run-up to the State Election (PRN) which is expected to take place this year.

On 12 May 2023, Mahathir left GTA. Mahathir reached that decision after realising that GTA could not function properly and failed to attract voters' support, especially during the 15th general election (GE15) in November 2022.

== Leadership structure ==
Interim founding leadership of GTA:

- Chairman:
  - Vacant
- Deputy Chairman:
  - Ustaz Zamani bin Ibrahim (BERJASA)
  - Dato' Paduka Ibrahim bin Ali (PUTRA)
  - Datuk Mohammed Mosin Abdul Rajak (IMAN)
  - Aminuddin Yahaya (Gagasan Bangsa)
- Women Chief:
  - Vacant
- Youth Chief:
  - Nasrul Ali Hasan Abdul Latif (PUTRA)
- Women's Youth Chief:
  - Azliza Rajain (BERJASA)
- Chief Secretary:
  - Marzuki Yahya (direct member)
- Treasurer:
  - Mohamed Ismail (BERJASA)
- Information Chief:
  - Nizam Mahsar
- Executive Council Members:
  - Dato' Mohamad Rosli Mohamad Ramli (BERJASA)
  - Tan Sri Dato' Mohammad Khalid bin Mohammad Yunus (PUTRA)
  - Datuk Mohamed Ismail bin Ibrahim (IMAN)
  - Borhan Ahmad bin Zakaria (PUTRA)
  - Dr Amir Hamzah Abdul Rajak (IMAN)
  - En. Azriq Rosman (BERJASA)
  - Prof Dr Ahmad Murad bin Merican - Scholar
  - Ahmad Zakie bin Ahmad Shariff - Financial professional
  - Syed Hassan Ali - NGO figure
  - Nazmi bin Desa - Religious scholar
  - Khaidir bin Ahmad - Environment and grassroot (marhaen) activist
  - encik Dr Farhan bin Rusli - Scholar and professional
  - Datuk Dr Abdul Halim bin Sher - Doctor of Medicine

- Chairman Kedah State:
  - Vacant
- Chairman Perlis State:
  - Vacant
- Chairman Wilayah Pesekutuan:
  - Vacant
- Chairman Johor State:
  - Vacant
- Chairman Kelantan State:
  - Vacant
- Chairman Terengganu State:
  - Vacant
- Chairman Selangor State:
  - Vacant
- Chairman Penang Islands State:
  - Vacant
- Chairman Perak State:
  - Vacant
- Chairman Pahang State:
  - Vacant
- Chairman Sarawak State:
  - Vacant
- Chairman Sabah State:
  - Vacant
- Chairman Nine State:
  - Vacant
- Chairman Melaka State:
  - Vacant

== Member parties ==
At its founding, it consists of 3 member parties:

Logo	Name		Ideology	Position	Leader(s)	Seats contested	Current seats
Logo	Name		Ideology	Position	Leader(s)	Composition	
Member parties						Composition	
	PUTRA	Malaysia Mighty Bumiputera Party; Parti Bumiputera Perkasa Malaysia	Malay nationalism	Far-right	Ibrahim Ali	49	0 / 222
	BERJASA	Pan-Malaysian Islamic Front; Barisan Jamaah Islamiah Se-Malaysia	Islamism	Right-wing	Zamani Ibrahim	45	0 / 222
	IMAN	National Indian Muslim Alliance Party; Parti Perikatan India Muslim Nasional	Indo-Malaysian Muslim interests	Right-wing	Mohammed Mossin Abdul Razak	19	0 / 222

=== Former member parties ===
- Homeland Fighter's Party (PEJUANG), (2022–2023)

== Elected representatives ==
As of the 15th General Election, neither of the parties has elected representatives in the parliament.

== General election results ==
Election	Total seats won	Seats contested	Total votes	Voting percentage	Outcome of election	Election leader
2022	0 / 222	125	109,175	0.70%	No representation in Parliament (Gerakan Tanah Air)	Mahathir Mohamad

== State election results ==
Election	Total seats won	Seats contested	Total votes	Voting percentage	Outcome of election	Election leader

== See also ==
- List of political parties in Malaysia
- 2020-22 Malaysian political crisis
