= Baldgate =

Malaysian Gambling Scandal

Baldgate (also known as botakgate and bald 11) is a Malaysian scandal that began on January 30, 2006, when Malaysian police detained eleven senior citizens for playing mahjong, a gambling game. Gambling with chips is common among Malaysian Chinese, but gambling for money is illegal without a license. The incident came only a few days after the independent commission reviewing the Malaysian lock-up detainee abuse scandal of 2005 released its findings.

The suspects, Chee Kit Sing, 65, Chi Kong Eng, 31, Tee Boon Kiah, 55, Lee Chu Heng, 63, Lim Kee Swee, 64, Lee Swee Fong, 49, and Lim Yew Bee, 54, were arrested at a coffee shop in Kajang, Selangor, on the second day of the Chinese New Year. All of the 103 detainees in the same lock-up, forced to strip to their underpants and had their heads shaved bald. The eleven men were released the day after their arrest.

A spokesman for the Kajang police defended the head-shaving as "standard procedure," the same rationale provided for the scandal of 2005. He also stated it was in accordance with Section 9a of the Lock Up Rules. The Kajang police have also shown great disrespect to Chinese culture and traditions as shaving one bald during Chinese New Year is a great taboo. Malaysian Parliamentary opposition leader Lim Kit Siang of the Democratic Action Party (DAP) gave the incident the moniker of "botakgate".

== See also ==
- Malaysian lock-up detainee abuse scandal
