= Tal Tujuh =

Village in Pasir Mas, Kelantan, Malaysia

Tal Tujuh is a village in the district of Pasir Mas, Kelantan, Malaysia.

This kampung got its name from seven "tal" trees that formerly grew side by side in the village.

== Description ==
The majority of the people in the village are Malay and Muslim. There are about 5% Chinese people. Most of the villagers are farmers, but some are government workers and private officers.

The chief for this village is called "penghulu kampung", and the post is now held by Encik Mokhtar. He was appointed by the Kelantan State Authority to hold the post since 1990.

A madrasah called Hj. Abdullah, which was founded by Allahyarham Tuan Guru Hj Abdullah bin Awang, was located in the village. He was an Islamic scholar or 'ulamak' from the 1950s to the early 1970s. The building was converted to a mosque in the early 1970s.

The village was visited by former Malaysian Prime Minister Tun Abdullah Hj Ahmad Badawi during the by-election in Permatang Pasir for the state assembly chair which included this village. He was campaigning for his party, Barisan Nasional. The seat was won by the Pan-Malaysian Islamic Party during 2008 general election.
