= Parti Bumiputera Perkasa Malaysia =

Malaysian political party

Malaysian Mighty Bumiputera Party
- Malay name: Parti Bumiputera Perkasa Malaysia
- Jawi name: ڤرتي بوميڤوترا ڤركاس مليسيا
- Abbreviation: PUTRA
- President: Ibrahim Ali
- Deputy President: Mohd Khalid Mohd Yunus
- Founder: Ibrahim Ali
- Founded: 17 August 2018
- Legalised: 8 May 2019
- Split from: United Malays National Organisation (UMNO)
- Preceded by: Pertubuhan Pribumi Perkasa (PERKASA)
- Headquarters: No.88, Level 2, Jalan Datuk Haji Eusoff, Titiwangsa Sentral, 50400 Federal Territory of Kuala Lumpur, Malaysia.
- Youth wing: Nasrul Ali Hasan Abdul Latif
- Women's wing: Nurhafizah Jamalludin
- Women's Youth wing: Nurhafizah Jamalludin
- Ideology: Islamism; Ketuanan Melayu; National conservatism Bumiputera nationalism Right-wing populism Monarchism; Anti-communism; Ultranationalism
- Political position: Far-right
- Religion: Sunni Islam
- National affiliation: Gerakan Tanah Air (since 2022); Ikatan Prihatin Rakyat (since 2025)
- Colours: Yellow, Red
- Slogan: Berjuang, Berkhidmat, Berkorban
- Dewan Negara: 0 / 70
- Dewan Rakyat: 0 / 222
- Dewan Undangan Negeri: 0 / 592

Party flag

Website
- www.putraperkasa.my

Parti Bumiputera Perkasa Malaysia (English: Malaysia Mighty Bumiputera Party, Jawi: ڤرتي بوميڤوترا ڤركاس مليسيا, abbr. PUTRA) is an ultranationalist political party in Malaysia. The party was founded and led by Ibrahim Ali.

== History ==
Ibrahim Ali who is also the founding president of Pertubuhan Pribumi Perkasa (PERKASA), a Non-governmental Organisation (NGO) for Malay supremacy, had announced a new party would be set-up to serve as an alternative to the Malays and would champion the rights of the Malays and Islam after the 2018 general election which saw the downfall of Barisan Nasional (BN) and United Malays National Organisation (UMNO) government; echoing his earlier projection in 2013 of turning PERKASA into a full-fledged political party.

PUTRA formation was first unveiled and announced by Ibrahim Ali as the party pro-tem president on 17 August 2018. following its online registration application on 13 August, delivery of its establishment documents on 16 August; and subsequently a few meetings then with the Registrar of Societies (RoS).

In March 2019, Ibrahim had filed a court application for leave and judicial review to challenge the action by RoS to not approve PUTRA and sought a mandamus order to compel the respondent to approve the application for registration by PUTRA. Finally PUTRA registration was approved and recognised by the RoS on 8 May. PUTRA was officially launched by Ibrahim in Kampung Baru, Kuala Lumpur on 28 September.

Almost all of party constitution of PUTRA is based on the constitution of the "original" UMNO founded in 1946, to match the pure goals of the party in the beginning. The party's membership is open to all Malay, including Bumiputera Malaysians but also non-Bumiputera who are Muslims as associate members.

On 10 August 2022, PUTRA vice president and former Member of the Perak State Legislative Assembly (MLA) for Sungai Rapat Hamidah Osman left the party with immediate effect upon her disappointment and sadness over the party joining Gerakan Tanah Air (GTA), a new political coalition consisting of Homeland Fighters Party (PEJUANG) led by former Prime Minister Mahathir Mohamad and other Malay-based political parties five days prior on 5 August 2022 as well as her loss of trust in party president Ibrahim Ali and other party leaders. She also noted that she would carry on championing the issue of Malay reserve land through other platforms like the non-governmental organisation (NGO).

On 25 February 2023, Mahathir joined PUTRA along with 12 other former PEJUANG members, including Mohd Tahir Kassim (Pahang) and Liza Meman (Perak).

== General election results ==
Election	Total seats won	Seats contested	Total votes	Voting percentage	Outcome of election	Election leader
2022	0 / 222	31	12,061	0.08%	; No representation in Parliament (Gerakan Tanah Air)	Ibrahim Ali

== State election results ==
PUTRA had made a debut contesting for 5 seats in the 2021 Malacca state election. In 2022 Johor state election, the only seat that PUTRA had contesting is Semerah. However, it didn't win any single seats.

State assembly	Election	Votes	%	Seats	Won/contested	+/–	Position (Note: As part of electoral coalition.)	Status
Perlis	2022	Did not contest						No seats
Kedah	2023	Did not contest						No seats
Kelantan	2023	Did not contest						No seats
Terengganu	2023	Did not contest						No seats
Penang	2023	Did not contest						No seats
Perak	2022	Did not contest						No seats
Pahang	2022	785	0.1	0 / 42	0 / 1	Steady	4th (Gerakan Tanah Air)	No seats
Selangor	2023	Did not contest						No seats
Negeri Sembilan	2026	Did not contest						No seats
Malacca	2026	1,317	0.3	0 / 28	0 / 1	Steady	▼6th	No seats
Johor	2026	Did not contest						No seats
Sabah	2025	Did not contest						No seats
Sarawak	2021	Did not contest						No seats

Note

State election	State Legislative Assembly													
State election	Perlis	Kedah	Kelantan	Terengganu	Penang	Perak	Pahang	Selangor	Negeri Sembilan	Malacca	Johor	Sabah	Sarawak	Total won / Total contested
2/3 majority	2 / 3	2 / 3	2 / 3	2 / 3	2 / 3	2 / 3	2 / 3	2 / 3	2 / 3	2 / 3	2 / 3	2 / 3	2 / 3	
2021										0 / 28				0 / 5
2022											0 / 56			0 / 1
2022						0 / 59								0 / 1
2026									0 / 36					

== See also ==
- Ibrahim Ali
- Pertubuhan Pribumi Perkasa (Perkasa)
- United Malays National Organisation (UMNO)
- List of political parties in Malaysia
- Malaysian General Election
- Politics of Malaysia
