= Pasir Mas (town) =

Coordinates: 6°02′N 102°08′E

Pasir Mas Pasey Mah (Kelantan-Pattani Malay)
- Town and district capital
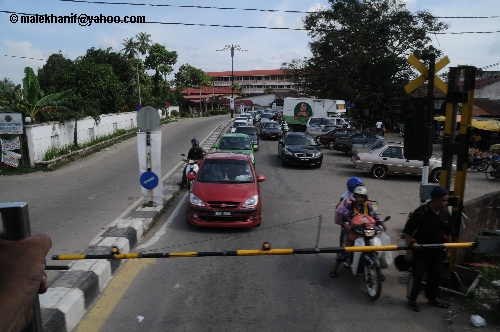

- Coat of arms
- Interactive map of Pasir Mas
- Country: Malaysia
- State: Kelantan Darul Naim
- District: Pasir Mas District

Government
  - Type: Local government
  - Body: Pasir Mas District Council
  - President: Hazmi Abdul Hamid

Area
  - Total: 139 km^{2} (54 sq mi)

Population (2022)
  - Total: 233,400
  - Density: 1,680/km^{2} (4,350/sq mi)
- Postcode: 17xxx
- Calling code: +6-09-7
- Vehicle registration: D
- Website: mdpmas.kelantan.gov.my

Pasir Mas District Council Majlis Daerah Pasir Mas

Type
- Type: Local authority

History
- Founded: 1 January 1979

Leadership
- President: Hazmi Abdul Hamid
- District secretary: Mohd Khalis Syafiq Mohamad Nor

Meeting place
- Kompleks Apam Putra, Bandar Bharu Pasir Mas, 17070 Pasir Mas, Kelantan.

Website
- mdpmas.kelantan.gov.my

Pasir Mas (Jawi: ڤاسير مس, Chinese: 巴西馬, Kelantanese: Pasey Mah) is a town in Pasir Mas District, in north-western Kelantan, Malaysia.

Pasir Mas is Kelantan's second largest city by population (230,424 in 2020 census).

== History ==
According to legend, this area which is now known as Pasir Mas was first opened up by Che Leh Ismail who was also known as Che Leh Tok Pendekar. Che Leh Ismail was forced to move to Pasir Mas from Kota Bharu when his land was taken over by the Sultan to build his palace.

During that time, a religious teacher from Bachok came to teach the Quran to the villagers in Pasir Mas. The religious teacher returned to Bachok after his teachings were completed. However, a few days after the religious teacher returned to Bachok, three pots of gold suddenly appeared in some bushes. The pots of gold then rolled into a pond at the fringe of the bushes. The villagers who witnessed this happening shouted "Mas! Mas!" (Malay for gold) Hence the place was subsequently called Pasir Mas. The word Pasir originated because there was a large field of sand at the bank of the Kelantan River, which was situated near Pasir Mas.

== Development ==
Haphazard development over the past decades has resulted in the mushrooming of residential houses that encircle the town. This makes potential land acquisition for commercial development a complex and costly exercise. A new township is slowly taking shape about four miles away at the Mukim of Lubuk Jong - a previously swampy area along the road leading to Rantau Panjang.

== Notable people from Pasir Mas ==
- Neelofa, actress
- Siti Aisyah Rosli, National weightlifter
- Tunku Puan Zanariah, Tunku Puan of Johor and the 8th Raja Permaisuri Agong of Malaysia
- Zulkifeli Mohd Zin, 18th and the former Chief of Malaysian Armed Forces

== See also ==
- Tal Tujuh
