= Pengkalan Pasir (state constituency) =

Pengkalan Pasir (N12)
Kelantan constituency

State constituency
- Legislature: Kelantan State Legislative Assembly
MLA
Mohamad Nasriff Daud
PN
- Constituency created: 1984
- First contested: 1986
- Last contested: 2023

Demographics
- Electors (2023): 33,007

Pengkalan Pasir is a state constituency in Kelantan, Malaysia, that has been represented in the Kelantan State Legislative Assembly.

The state constituency was first contested in 1986 and is mandated to return a single Assemblyman to the Kelantan State Legislative Assembly under the first-past-the-post voting system.

== Demographics ==
As of 2020, Pengkalan Pasir has a population of 37,373 people.

Ethnic breakdown of Pengkalan Pasir's electorate as of 2023
1. Malay (95.3%)
2. Chinese (3.95%)
3. Other ethnicities (0.63%)
4. Indian (0.12%)

== History ==
=== Polling districts ===
According to the Gazette issued on 30 March 2018, the Pengkalan Pasir constituency has a total of 9 polling districts.

State Constituency	Polling Districts	Code	Location
Pengkalan Pasir (N12）	Sakar	022/12/01	SK Mekasar
Pengkalan Pasir (N12）	Kubang Badak	022/12/02	SMK Kampung Dangar
Pengkalan Pasir (N12）	Kubang Bemban	022/12/03	SMK Kubang Bemban
Pengkalan Pasir (N12）	Kampung Bharu	022/12/04	SMK Sultan Ibrahim (2)
Pengkalan Pasir (N12）	Kampung Dangar	022/12/05	SK Sultan Ibrahim (3)
Pengkalan Pasir (N12）	Pengkalan Pasir	022/12/06	SK Dato' Abdul Hamid (2)
Pengkalan Pasir (N12）	Bandar Pasir Mas	022/12/07	SK Dato' Abdul Hamid (1)
Pengkalan Pasir (N12）	Slow Machang	022/12/08	SK Tanjong Chenak
Pengkalan Pasir (N12）	Kasa	022/12/09	SK Mekasar

=== Representation history ===
Members of the Legislative Assembly for Pengkalan Pasir
Assembly	No	Years	Member	Party
Constituency created from Bandar Pasir Mas
7th	N11	1986–1990	Hassan Ismail	BN (UMNO)
8th	N11	1990–1995	Hassan Abdullah	PAS
9th	N12	1995–1999	Hassan Abdullah	PAS
10th	N12	1999–2004	Hassan Abdullah	PAS
11th	N12	2004–2005	Wan Abdul Aziz Wan Jaafar	PAS
11th	N12	2005–2008	Hanafi Mamat	BN (UMNO)
12th	N12	2008–2013	Hanifa Ahmad	PR (PAS)
13th	N12	2013–2018	Hanifa Ahmad	PR (PAS)
14th	N12	2018–2020	Hanifa Ahmad	PAS
14th	N12	2020–2023	Hanifa Ahmad	PN (PAS)
15th	N12	2023–present	Mohamad Nasriff Daud	PN (PAS)

== Election results ==
Kelantan state election, 2023
Party	Candidate	Votes	%	∆%
PAS	Mohamad Nasriff Daud	13,077	70.71	▲17.56
PH	Rushdan Mustafa	5,416	29.29	▲29.29
Total valid votes		18,493	100.00	
Total rejected ballots		166		
Unreturned ballots		42		
Turnout		18,701	56.66	▼19.57
Registered electors		33,007		
Majority		7,661	41.42	▲17.33
PAS hold		Swing		

Kelantan state election, 2018
Party	Candidate	Votes	%	∆%
PAS	Hanifa Ahmad	10,143	53.15	▼7.53
BN	Che Johan Che Pa	5,545	29.06	▼10.26
PKR	Mohd Sharani Mohd Naim	2,570	13.47	▲13.47
Independent	Suharto Mat Nasir	826	4.33	▲4.33
Total valid votes		19,084	100.00	
Total rejected ballots		380		
Unreturned ballots		216		
Turnout		19,680	76.23	▼5.97
Registered electors		25,817		
Majority		4,598	24.09	▲2.73
PAS hold		Swing		

Kelantan state election, 2013
Party	Candidate	Votes	%	∆%
PAS	Hanifa Ahmad	13,398	60.68	▲4.30
BN	Tuan Anuwa Tuan Mat	8,683	39.32	▼4.30
Total valid votes		22,081	100.00	
Total rejected ballots		278		
Unreturned ballots		95		
Turnout		22,454	82.20	▼0.79
Registered electors		27,327		
Majority		4,715	21.36	▲8.60
PAS hold		Swing		

Kelantan state election, 2008
Party	Candidate	Votes	%	∆%
PAS	Hanifa Ahmad	10,377	56.38	▲7.31
BN	Mohd Yaman Muhamad	8,029	43.62	▼5.45
Total valid votes		18,406	100.00	
Total rejected ballots		274		
Unreturned ballots		60		
Turnout		18,740	82.99	▲9.99
Registered electors		22,582		
Majority		2,348	12.76	▲11.88
PAS gain from BN		Swing		?

Kelantan state by-election, 6 December 2005 The by-election was called due to the death of incumbent, Wan Abdul Aziz Wan Jaafar.
Party	Candidate	Votes	%	∆%
BN	Hanafi Mamat	7,422	49.07	▼0.73
PAS	Hanifa Ahmad	7,288	48.19	▼2.01
Independent	Ibrahim Ali	415	2.74	▲2.74
Total valid votes		15,125	100.00	
Total rejected ballots		325		
Unreturned ballots		0		
Turnout		15,450	73.00	▼4.64
Registered electors		18,411		
Majority		134	0.88	▲0.48
BN gain from PAS		Swing		?

Kelantan state election, 2004
Party	Candidate	Votes	%	∆%
PAS	Wan Abdul Aziz Wan Jaafar	7,168	50.20	▼10.90
BN	Zaid Fadzil	7,112	49.80	▲10.90
Total valid votes		14,280	100.00	
Total rejected ballots		196		
Unreturned ballots		0		
Turnout		14,476	77.64	▲2.66
Registered electors		18,646		
Majority		56	0.40	▼21.80
PAS hold		Swing		

Kelantan state election, 1999
Party	Candidate	Votes	%	∆%
PAS	Hassan Abdullah	7,877	61.10	▲6.79
BN	Abdul Rahim Abdul Rahman	5,015	38.90	▼6.79
Total valid votes		12,892	100.00	
Total rejected ballots		217		
Unreturned ballots		22		
Turnout		13,131	74.98	▲1.93
Registered electors		17,512		
Majority		2,862	22.20	▲13.58
PAS hold		Swing		

Kelantan state election, 1995
Party	Candidate	Votes	%	∆%
PAS	Hassan Abdullah	6,529	54.31	▼8.68
BN	Zaid Fadzil	5,493	45.69	▲8.68
Total valid votes		12,022	100.00	
Total rejected ballots		272		
Unreturned ballots		77		
Turnout		12,371	73.05	▼1.43
Registered electors		16,936		
Majority		1,036	8.62	▼17.36
PAS hold		Swing		

Kelantan state election, 1990
Party	Candidate	Votes	%	∆%
PAS	Hassan Abdullah	6,872	62.99	▲23.95
BN	Hassan Ismail	4,037	37.01	▼23.95
Total valid votes		10,909	100.00	
Total rejected ballots		231		
Unreturned ballots		0		
Turnout		11,140	74.48	▲4.09
Registered electors		14,958		
Majority		2,835	25.98	▲4.06
PAS gain from BN		Swing		?

Kelantan state election, 1986
Party	Candidate	Votes	%
BN	Hassan Ismail	5,743	60.96
PAS	Ismail Noh	3,678	39.04
Total valid votes		9,421	100.00
Total rejected ballots		284	
Unreturned ballots		0	
Turnout		9,705	70.39
Registered electors		13,787	
Majority		2,065	21.92
This was a new constituency created.
