= National Language Act 1963/67 =

Malaysian law

Parliament of Malaysia
- Long title: An Act to consolidate the law relating to the use of the national language.
- Citation: Act 32
- Territorial extent: Throughout Malaysia, except Sarawak
- Passed by: Dewan Rakyat
- Passed: 11 March 1963
- Enacted: 1963 (Act No. 10 of 1963); and 1967 (Act No. 7 of 1967); Consolidated and revised: 1971 (Act 32 w.e.f. 1 July 1971)
- Passed by: Dewan Negara
- Passed: 15 March 1963
- Effective: Peninsular Malaysia–sections 9 to 11–11 April 1963, Act 10 of 1963; Remainder–1 September 1967, Act 7 of 1967

Legislative history

First chamber: Dewan Rakyat
- Bill title: National Language Bill 1963
- Introduced by: Abdul Razak Hussein, Deputy Prime Minister
- First reading: 28 November 1962
- Second reading: 11 March 1963
- Third reading: 11 March 1963

Second chamber: Dewan Negara
- Bill title: National Language Bill 1963
- Member(s) in charge: Mohamed Ismail Mohamed Yusof, Assistant Minister of Information and Broadcasting
- First reading: 15 March 1963
- Second reading: 15 March 1963
- Third reading: 15 March 1963

Amended by
- National Language (Amendment and Extension) Act 1983 [Act A554] National Language (Amendment) Act 1990 [Act A765] Constitution (Amendment) Act 1994 [Act A885] National Language (Amendment) Act 1994 [Act A901]

Related legislation
- National Language (Application) Enactment 1973 [En. No. 7/1973]

Keywords
- National language
- Status: In force

The National Language Act 1963/67 (Malay: Akta Bahasa Kebangsaan 1963/67), is a Malaysian law enacted to consolidate the law relating to the use of the national language, as promised by the preceding Malayan government to be done 10 years after its independence.

== Structure ==
The National Language Act 1963/67, in its current form (1 January 2006), consists of 11 sections and no schedule (including 4 amendments), without separate Part.

- Section 1: Short title, application and commencement
- Section 2: National language to be used for official purposes
- Section 3: Use of translation
- Section 4: Continued use of English may be permitted
- Section 5: Use of English language may be permitted in Parliament and Legislative Assembly
- Section 6: Authoritative text of laws
- Section 7: Written laws enacted prior to 1 September 1967
- Section 8: Language of Courts
- Section 9: Script of national language
- Section 10: Form of numerals
- Section 11: Forms

== Application to Borneo States ==
=== Sabah ===
This Act has been extended to Sabah and approved by the State Legislature of Sabah to be applied to Sabah in 1973 under the National Language (Application) Enactment 1973 and Article 161(3) of the Federal Constitution.

=== Sarawak ===
This Act does not apply to Sarawak as no enactment or approval has been made by the State Legislature of Sarawak since the formation of Malaysia in 1963 to allow this Act to be applied to Sarawak under Article 161(3) of the Federal Constitution. English continues to be the official language for the state of Sarawak till this day.

== Application to universities and colleges ==
=== International Islamic University Malaysia (IIUM) ===
The Act does not apply or extended to the International Islamic University Malaysia (IIUM) as there are no provisions that allows IIUM to expand it beyond its university purposes. English continues to be the official language of instruction and administration for the university up to this day.
