= Sekolah Kebangsaan Sungai Binjai =

Sungai Binjai National School
- Sekolah Kebangsaan; Sungai Binjai سكوله كبڠسأن سوڠاي بينجاي
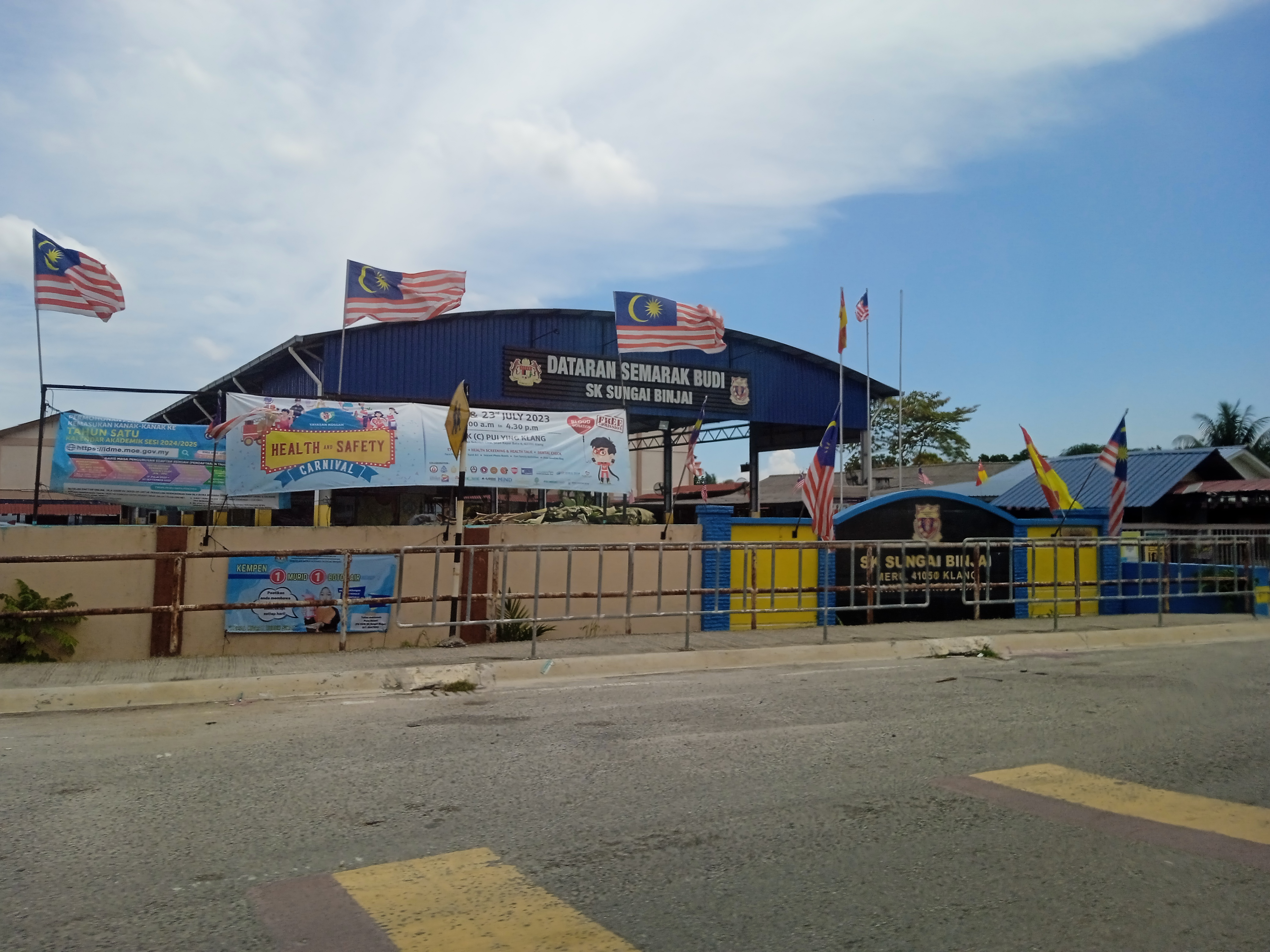

Location
- Batu 6, Pekan Meru; Klang, Selangor Darul Ehsan, 41050; Malaysia
- Coordinates: 03°08′16″N 101°26′18″E

Information
- School type: Government Non-Boarding primary school
- Motto: "Pantas dan Prihatin" ("Appropriate and Concerned")
- Established: October 17, 1917
- Founder: Abdul Karim Bin Taari
- Status: Opened
- School code: BBA 0012
- Headmaster: Roslan Bin Zakaria(current)
- Staff: ±188 (Both academic and non-academic)
- Years offered: Pre-school until Year 6
- Age range: 6 to 12 years old
- Enrollment: 3268 (2017)
- Language: Malay, English, Arabic
- Colours: Blue, Yellow and Red
- Affiliations: Ministry Of Education Malaysia/Kementerian Pendidikan Malaysia

Sekolah Kebangsaan Sungai Binjai (Jawi:سكوله كبڠسأن سوڠاي بينجاي), commonly known as SK Sungai Binjai and SKSB (or sometimes, Binjai), is a primary school in Malaysia.

SK Sungai Binjai is the first and oldest school built in the town of Meru. In 2013, it was estimated that there were 3268 students enrolled at the school. There are a total of 91 classes (44 classes for evening session, 43 classes for morning session and 4 pre-school classes) altogether. The school is also currently divided into 2 sessions, the morning session is for pre-school and Level 2 pupils (Year 4 - Year 6), and the evening session for Level 1 pupils (Year 1 - Year 3). Both sessions are in the same administration, however the evening session is given to the Evening Senior Assistant/Evening Principal (Penolong Kanan Petang) to administer and to handle any official matters regarding the evening session teachers and pupils.

At SK Sungai Binjai there are 4 Pre-school classes located within the school compound. The classes are Pre Permata, Pre Berlian, Pre Intan and Pre Mutiara.

Currently the number of staff and teachers are approximately 188 people altogether (175 academic teachers and 13 supporting/non-academic staff)^{January 2013}.

== Administration ==
The current headmaster of SK Sungai Binjai is currently unknown, but started serving the school since 2017. Other administrators of the school include:

- Pn. Azizah Binti Noh - GPK Pentadbiran/Kurikulum (Sr. Asst. Curriculum/Administration)
- Pn. Maziah bt. Ismail - GPK Hal Ehwal Murid (Sr. Asst. Student Affairs)
- En. Husni bin Darus - GPK Ko-Kurikulum (Sr. Asst. Co-Curriculum)
- Pn. Halimatuz Saadiah bt. Yalinarambil - GPK Petang (Sr. Asst. Evening/Evening Principal)

The school mission and vision is to developing individual potential through quality education.

== History ==
SK Sungai Binjai is a centenarian school (the school celebrates its 100th anniversary in 2017). One thing interesting to note is that although SK Sungai Binjai has gone through several phases of government (British Administration, Japanese Military Administration, returned to British administration and subsequent post-independence era), the state of the school and its surroundings have not changed much. Some say that SK Sungai Binjai was once used as a communist hideout, through the stories of the alumni who attended school around the 50s and 60s.

=== The legendary river ===
The name "Sungai Binjai" originated from the Binjai trees that grows along the river. The fruit can be eaten and it can weighs up to a kilogram when it is matured enough. According to the mouth-to-mouth resources told by the elders of Kampung Meru, this exact river was the famous Malay folklore story Batu Belah Batu Bertangkup (The Split Boulder) originated, where the story of a mother who wanted to eat the eggs of a mudskipper, and end up being swallowed by a magical boulder after she ran away, frustrated at the expense of her son eaten her precious mudskipper eggs without her permission. She asked to be swallowed by the boulder herself and locked inside forever since. From that split boulder came the name Kampung Batu Belah, a rural village situated in Kapar. The first settlers of Kampung Meru mostly came from Kampung Batu Belah.

=== The start (1917–1923) ===
It was said that the history of Sungai Binjai was older than Kampung Meru itself, and why this school was named after. This school was known earlier as Sungai Binjai Malay School. This school was first built by the locals of Kampung Meru (mostly Javanese settlers came from Batu Belah) in 1917 to meet the needs of the residents of Kampung Meru, at the city of Klang as to enable their children to get a proper education. On October 6, 1917, the school started with only 49 pupils. The founder and the first Headmaster, Abdul Karim b. Taari was the only teacher at that time serving the school. In 1917 the site of the original school was founded on the present site of SJK (Chinese) Tiong Hua Kok Bin and used until 1923.

=== The first move (1923–1954) ===
In 1924 the school's name was changed to the Sekolah Kebangsaan Sungai Binjai and moved to the site of Pusat Kesihatan Meru (Meru Health Center) today. In 1924 a new school building was built on the Pipeline Road (Jalan Paip) about a quarter mile from the town of Meru. In this new school building, the situation was also similar to the old school. The increasing number of pupils from time to time, until it reached 105 pupils. The school was no longer suitable to be used for several reasons: the increased number of pupils and secondly, the school was frequently flooded during heavy rain. Obviously these matters were the reason of pupils studies had been interrupted for quite some time. Pupils of all levels were placed in a building without restrictions, and this situation lasted until 1954.

The Headmaster's residence was connected directly with the school building. Other teachers lived in quarters (3-doors detached houses) near the school. It was situated behind the school.

=== The second move/recent site (1954–present) ===
On the basis of the needs of the pupils, the school had moved to its current site in 1954, which is located not far from the original site and the second site.

Given the state of the school buildings are too old and the increasing number of students is too overwhelming, then the government had moved the school to a new site about 4 1/2 acres (previously owned by Tuan Hj. Ahmad Tafsir) of the site of the present school building. The school has its own shape and a distinct look, and it was officially used in 1955. The new school can accommodate a total enrollment of 500 pupils.

Unfortunately, the numbers of pupils keep on rising as years come. To solve the problem, the school was divided into 2 sessions (mornings and evenings) in 1964.

Official opening of the school was held on October 22, 1977, and was inaugurated by the then Chief Minister of Selangor YAB Dato' Seri Haji Hormat Bin Rafei, for opening the 1-storey buildings used for administrative purposes until 2010, where the school administration has now moved on new 2-storey detached buildings completed around 2010, replacing the dilapidated building that has been used since 1955. The old wooden building had been demolished on May 9, 2008.

Since October 2013, the new surau (Muslim prayer house) has started its construction and will be expected to be complete in the middle 2014.

Some images of the old buildings can still be seen in some blogs and Flicker owned by the old pupils of SK Sungai Binjai.

== List of previous headmasters and chairman of the parent-teacher association (PTA) ==
=== The honourable list of headmasters serving the school since 1917 ===
Headmaster	Tenure
En. Abdul Karim bin Taari	1917-1924
En. Ahmad bin. Hj. M. Saman	1924-1928
En. Tambi Ahmad bin Hj. Othman	1928-1930
Tuan Haji M. Said bin Hj. Abd. Rahman	1930-1932
En. Musa bin T. Muda	1932-1935
En. Tambi Ahmad bin Hj. Othman	1935-1938
En. M. Sidin bin A. Wahid	1938-1949
En. Montel bin M. Amin	1949-1953
En. Sulaiman bin Hj. A. Bakar PJK, JP	1953-1955
En. Ab. Rahman bin Lebai Din	1955-1960
En. Ab. Karim bin Ahmad PJK, PPN, AMS	1960-1971
En. Ahmad Dahlan bin Buyong	1971-1980
En. Abdullah bin Mastam PJK	1985-1988
En. Hassan bin Busu PJK	1989-1991
En. Yusop bin Ahmat	1991-1992
En. Abdul Aziz bin Mohamed PJK	1992-2008
En. Azman bin Mingan PPT	2008-2017
En. Mohd Hafiz bin Md. Shariff	2017-2018
En. Roslan bin Zakaria	2018-current

== Identity ==
=== The emblem ===
The emblem was designed in 1966 by Tn. Haji Abdul Karim b. Ahmad, the 11th Headmaster of the school. The colour scheme used are blue, red and yellow, each had its own significant meaning on its own.

- Blue - represents harmony and unity.
- Red and Yellow - both representing the state of Selangor.
- Book and torch - represent knowledge and progress.
- Rice stalk - represent prosperity.

The motto Ilmu Suluh Kemajuan (Knowledge is the Torch of Progress) means that knowledge is important to everyone. It will become the torch that lightens the life to progress and to succeed.

== Extracurricular and co-academics activities and achievements ==
Basically, all co-curricular activities in SKSB only available for Level 2 (Year 4 - Year 5) pupils/students. Each and every pupils may choose any kinds of sports, uniformed bodies and co-academics clubs and associations that suit their interest.

=== Sports ===
SKSB participates in the Klang district level (MSSD Klang) and in the MSSS (Selangor School Sports Council) tournament at the state level. Among the sports that SKSB participates in are football, touch rugby, softball, netball, pingpong, tenpin bowling, sepak takraw, silat, handball, and athletics. SKSB is the defending champion in football and rugby at the district level. All team participating are in under-12 category.

=== Co-academics ===
Besides co-curricular achievements, SKSB also had won in many co-academics competitions around district and states level. One of the most distinguished achievements is the Doktor Muda (Young Doctors) Team, who had won the 2013 Overall Champions in the Klang District level. Besides Doktor Muda, SKSB had won both district and states level in Malay language pantun, speech, story telling (level 1 and 2) and also syair.

SKSB also had been known in the MTQ (Majlis Tilawah Qur'an) arena, that the nasyid, tilawa Al-Qur'an, Islamic story telling and Qur'an memorizing (hafazan) team had placed less than 3rd each time competing in district level.

SKSB also are aiming to compete in English, Mathematics, Kajian Tempatan/Sivik (Local Studies/Civic), Sains (Science), Muzik (Music), Moral Studies, Kemahiran Hidup (Life Skills), J-Qaf (Jawi, Qur'an and basic Fardhu Ain) and Arabic Language, and also pre-school competitions held around Klang district.

== Ethos ==
SKSB has several clubs, teams and groups that made the ethos or characters of the school in co-curricular achievements. These teams, clubs and groups had proven themselves several times in district, state and national level. SKSB's ethos are marching (Team Mujahid Kecil), nasyid (Harraz Generations), dikir barat (Wujdan), football/soccer (Sungai Binjai Football Club) and Kelab Doktor Muda (The Young Doctors Club, a school-based health promotional program between Ministry of Health and Ministry of Education).

=== Drill/marching team (Kawad Kaki) ===
SKSB Drill Team, once known as Pasukan Kawad Kaki/Team Mujahid Kecil (The Little Mujahids) has made various district and state level for excellence since its inception in 2002. And has been a champion at the national level around the year 2005–2013. This team focused on marching and drill exercise such as formation, static and dynamic drill.

=== Nasyid team ===
Established in 2008, this nasyid group is well known in the Klang district as one of the most active groups available. This group had won several titles in the MTQ (Majlis Tilawah Al-Quran), The Primary School Nasyid Festival and other nasyid-related competition in district, state and national levels organized by the Ministry of Education or the State Education Department. They had also entered private competitions outside of the school and emerged as champions in those competitions.

=== Dikir barat team ===
This special dikir barat team had been established in 2013 for the purpose of entering the Klang District's Arabic Language Competition. Eventually, this unique team had taken the attraction of many people because of their dikir barat songs are mainly sung in Arabic. Because of that uniqueness, the team had been briefly called by Malaysia's TV9 to join in as their opening and midsection of the semi-religious program Rasul Yang Kata (The Prophet Said).

=== Sungai Binjai Football Club (SBFC) ===
This football club had been established in 2014 in order to compete in 1 Malaysia Cardiff City Cup, in Under-12 category. Placed in Division 2 of the league, it had a good start and now (until March 2014), this team is placed 4th among 16 teams competed in the Klang Valley Zone. This team also served as the representative team of SKSB in district, state and national levels organized by the Ministry of Education.

=== Junior Doctors Club (Kelab Doktor Muda) ===
Doktor Muda started in 1989 and officially recognized by the Ministry of Education in 2006 and granted the status of the program as a club. In SKSB, Doktor muda had many successful achievements from districts to national levels. It was awarded The Most Active Club at the national in 2013, after it was awarded the Best Doktor Muda Club in 2012 and 2013 in district and state level. The numbers of passing on the Doktor Muda examination is also the highest in Klang districts, where average 85% of the candidates passed the exams to become a Doktor Muda.

== Trivia ==
- In March 2013, the SKSB's LINUS Programme class had been selected to be shown and aired by TV9's Nasi Lemak Kopi O, because of the 100% success of the LINUS Programme.
- It is said that SK Sungai Binjai is (or probably was) the record holder for being the most compact and the most populated primary school in Selangor. For the record, the school that holds the current record for being the most compact and the most populated school in Malaysia is Sekolah Menengah Kebangsaan Meru (SMK Meru), estimated about 4510 students and 226 teachers ^{2012}.
- In 2011, Nurdini Mohamad Ali, a Year 5 pupil was found dead after breaking the Ramadhan fast with her family. It was suspected that she died of food poisoning coming from the food that she bought previously at the Meru Ramadhan Bazaar.

== In Malaysian mass media ==
- Kisah SK Sungai Binjai - 2007
- Kisah SK Sungai Binjai - 2007
- Anugerah Kecermelangan Kokurikulum 2007
- Kem Kepimpinan SK Sungai Binjai 1999
- Dutch Lady Cabaran Sekolahku Generasi Membina, laporan sekolah
- Dutch Lady Cabaran Sekolahku Generasi Membina, laporan sekolah.
- Dutch Lady Cabaran Sekolahku Generasi Membina, tempat ke-2
- Platun SK Sungai Binjai Kembali Berkuasa (Sinar Harian)
- SK Sungai Binjai Johan Kawad Kaki Kebangsaan
- Peronda Denggi SKSB
