= Malaysia =

Country in Southeast Asia

- Flag Coat of arms
- Motto: Bersekutu Bertambah Mutu برسکوتو برتمبه موتو (Jawi) ("Unity is Strength")
- Anthem: Negaraku ("My Country")
- Location of Malaysia (green) in Southeast Asia
- Capital and largest city: Kuala Lumpur (Note: Constitutional capital, ceremonial and legislative); 3°8′N 101°41′E
- Administrative centre: Putrajaya (Note: Administrative and judicial); 2°56′N 101°42′E
- National language (official): Malay (Note: Section 9 of the National Language Act 1963/67 states that, "The script of the national language shall be the Rumi script: provided that this shall not prohibit the use of the Malay script, more commonly known as the Jawi script, of the national language.") (Note: Section 2 of the National Language Act 1963/67 states that, "Save as provided in this Act and subject to the safeguards contained in Article 152(1) of the Constitution relating to any other language and the language of any other community in Malaysia the national language shall be used for official purposes.") (Note: See Article 152 of the Federal Constitution of Malaysia and National Language Act 1963/67.)
- Recognised languages: English
- Ethnic groups (2026): 70.7% Bumiputera; 58.4% Malay; 12.3% indigenous groups of Sabah, Sarawak, Orang Asli and other; 22.0% Chinese; 6.5% Indian
- Religion (2020): 63.5% Islam (official); 18.7% Buddhism; 9.1% Christianity; 6.1% Hinduism; 0.9% other; 1.8% unknown
- Demonym: Malaysian
- Government: Federal parliamentary constitutional elective monarchy
  - Monarch: Ibrahim Iskandar
  - Prime Minister: Anwar Ibrahim
- Legislature: Parliament
  - Upper house: Dewan Negara
  - Lower house: Dewan Rakyat

Independence from the United Kingdom
  - Federation of Malaya: 31 August 1957
  - Sarawak self-governance: 22 July 1963
  - North Borneo self-governance: 31 August 1963
  - Proclamation of Malaysia: 16 September 1963

Area
  - Total: 330,803 km^{2} (127,724 sq mi) (67th)
  - Water (%): 0.3

Population
  - 2026 estimate: ▲34,374,300 (43rd)
  - 2020 census: 32,447,385
  - Density: 101/km^{2} (261.6/sq mi) (116th)
- GDP (PPP): 2026 estimate
  - Total: ▲$1.624 trillion (28th)
  - Per capita: ▲$47,453 (52nd)
- GDP (nominal): 2026 estimate
  - Total: ▲$547.100 billion (34th)
  - Per capita: ▲$15,981 (76th)
- Gini (2024): ▼39.0 medium inequality
- HDI (2023): ▲0.819 very high (67th)
- Currency: Malaysian ringgit (RM) (MYR)
- Time zone: UTC+8 (MST)
- Date format: dd-mm-yyyy
- Calling code: +60
- ISO 3166 code: MY
- Internet TLD: .my

Malaysia (Note: UK: /məˈleɪziə/ mə-LAY-zee-ə, US: /məˈleɪʒə/ mə-LAY-zhə; Malay: [malɛjsia]) is a country in Southeast Asia. A federal constitutional monarchy, it consists of 13 states and three federal territories, separated by the South China Sea into two regions: Peninsular Malaysia on Mainland Southeast Asia and East Malaysia on the island of Borneo. Peninsular Malaysia shares land and maritime borders with Thailand, as well as maritime borders with Singapore, Vietnam, and Indonesia; East Malaysia shares land borders with Brunei and Indonesia, and maritime borders with the Philippines and Vietnam. Kuala Lumpur is the country's national capital, largest city, and the seat of the legislative branch of the federal government, while Putrajaya is the federal administrative capital, representing the seat of both the executive branch and the judicial branch of the federal government. With a population of over 34 million, it is the world's 43rd-most populous country.

The country has its origins in the Malay kingdoms, which, from the 18th century on, became subject to the British Empire, along with the British Straits Settlements protectorate. During World War II, British Malaya, along with other nearby British and American colonies, was occupied by the Empire of Japan. Following three years of occupation, Malaya was briefly unified as the Malayan Union in 1946 until 1948 when it was restructured as the Federation of Malaya. The country achieved independence on 31 August 1957. On 16 September 1963, independent Malaya united with the then British crown colonies of North Borneo, Sarawak, and Singapore to become Malaysia. In August 1965, Singapore was separated from the federation and became an independent country.

Malaysia is tropical and is one of 17 megadiverse countries; it is home to numerous endemic species. The country is multiethnic and multicultural, which has a significant effect on its politics. About half the population is ethnically Malay, with minorities of Chinese, Indians, and indigenous peoples. The Bumiputra policy grants the Malay majority a constitutionally enshrined privileged status over Malaysian citizens who are Chinese or Indians via affirmative action measures. The official language is Malaysian Malay, a standard form of the Malay language. English remains an active second language. While recognising Islam as the official religion, the constitution grants freedom of religion to non-Muslims though conversion out of Islam is forbidden while conversion to it is allowed. The government is modelled on the Westminster parliamentary system, and the legal system is based on common law. The head of state is an elected monarch, chosen among the nine state rulers every five years. The head of government is the prime minister.

The country's economy was once heavily reliant on agriculture and primary commodities but is now driven by the services and manufacturing sectors. Malaysia ranks highly in peacefulness and passport strength and has a newly industrialised economy that is relatively open and state-oriented. The country is a founding member of the Organisation of Islamic Cooperation (OIC), the East Asia Summit (EAS), and the Association of Southeast Asian Nations (ASEAN), as well as a member of the Non-Aligned Movement (NAM), the Commonwealth of Nations, and the Asia-Pacific Economic Cooperation (APEC).

== Etymology ==
The name Malaysia is a combination of the word Malays and the Latin-Greek suffix -ia/-ία, which can be translated as 'land of the Malays'. Similar-sounding variants have also appeared in accounts older than the 11th century, as toponyms for areas in Sumatra or referring to a larger region around the Strait of Malacca. The Sanskrit text Vayu Purana, thought to have been in existence since the first millennium CE, mentioned a land named 'Malayadvipa', which was identified by certain scholars as the modern Malay Peninsula. Other notable accounts are by Ptolemy's 2nd-century Geographia, which used the name Malayu Kulon for the west coast of Golden Chersonese, and the 7th-century Yijing's account of Malayu.

At some point, the Melayu Kingdom took its name from the Sungai Melayu. Melayu then became associated with Srivijaya, and remained associated with various parts of Sumatra, especially Palembang, where the founder of the Malacca Sultanate is thought to have come from. It is only thought to have developed into an ethnonym as Malacca became a regional power in the 15th century. Islamisation established an ethnoreligious identity in Malacca, with the term Melayu beginning to appear as interchangeable with Melakans. It may have specifically referred to local Malay speakers who were loyal to the Malaccan Sultan. The initial Portuguese use of Malayos reflected this, referring only to the ruling people of Malacca. The prominence of traders from Malacca led Melayu to be associated with Muslim traders, and from there became associated with the wider cultural and linguistic group. Malacca and later Johor claimed they were the centre of Malay culture, a position supported by the British which led to the term Malay becoming more usually linked to the Malay peninsula rather than Sumatra.

Before the onset of European colonisation, the Malay Peninsula was known natively as Tanah Melayu ('Malay Land'). Under a racial classification created by German scholar Johann Friedrich Blumenbach, the natives of maritime Southeast Asia were grouped into a single category, the Malay race. Following the expedition of French navigator Jules Dumont d'Urville to Oceania in 1826, he later proposed the terms of Malaysia, Micronesia, and Melanesia to the Société de Géographie in 1831, distinguishing these Pacific cultures and island groups from the existing term Polynesia. Dumont d'Urville described Malaysia as "an area commonly known as the East Indies".

In 1850, the English ethnologist George Samuel Windsor Earl, writing in the Journal of the Indian Archipelago and Eastern Asia, proposed naming the islands of Southeast Asia as "Melayunesia" or "Indunesia", favouring the former. The name Malaysia gained some use to label what is now the Malay Archipelago. In modern terminology, Malay remains the name of an ethnoreligious group of Austronesian people predominantly inhabiting the Malay Peninsula and portions of the adjacent islands of Southeast Asia, including the east coast of Sumatra, the coast of Borneo, and smaller islands that lie between these areas.

The state that gained independence from the United Kingdom in 1957 took the name the Federation of Malaya, chosen in preference to other potential names such as Malaysia and Langkasuka, after the historic kingdom located at the upper section of the Malay Peninsula in the first millennium CE.

In 1963, the name Malaysia was adopted when the existing states of the Federation of Malaya, plus Singapore, North Borneo, and Sarawak, formed a new federation. (Note: In English, the official name of the country is simply "Malaysia". In Malay, the name of the country as it appears on some official documents, including the oath of Yang di-Pertuan Agong is Persekutuan Malaysia, meaning 'Federation of Malaysia'. Despite this, the name Malaysia is mostly used officially, including the Malaysia Agreement 1963 and the Federal Constitution.) One theory posits the name was chosen so that si represented the inclusion of Singapore, North Borneo, and Sarawak. Politicians in the Philippines contemplated renaming their state Malaysia before the modern country took the name.

== History ==
The Malacca Sultanate played a major role in spreading Islam throughout the Malay Archipelago.

Evidence of modern human habitation in Malaysia dates back 40,000 years. In the Malay Peninsula, the first inhabitants are thought to be Negritos. Areas of Malaysia participated in the Maritime Jade Road between 2000 BC to 1000 AD. Traders and settlers from India and China arrived as early as the first century AD, establishing trading ports and coastal towns in the second and third centuries. Their presence resulted in strong Indian and Chinese influences on the local cultures, and the people of the Malay Peninsula adopted the religions of Hinduism and Buddhism. Sanskrit inscriptions appear as early as the fourth or fifth century. The Kingdom of Langkasuka arose around the second century in the northern area of the Malay Peninsula, lasting until about the 15th century. Between the 7th and 13th centuries, much of the southern Malay Peninsula was part of the maritime Srivijayan empire. By the 13th and the 14th century, the Majapahit empire had successfully wrested control over most of the peninsula and the Malay Archipelago from Srivijaya. In the early 15th century, Parameswara, a runaway king of the former Kingdom of Singapura linked to the old Srivijayan court, founded the Malacca Sultanate. The spread of Islam increased following Parameswara's conversion to that religion. Malacca was an important commercial centre during this time, attracting trade from around the region.

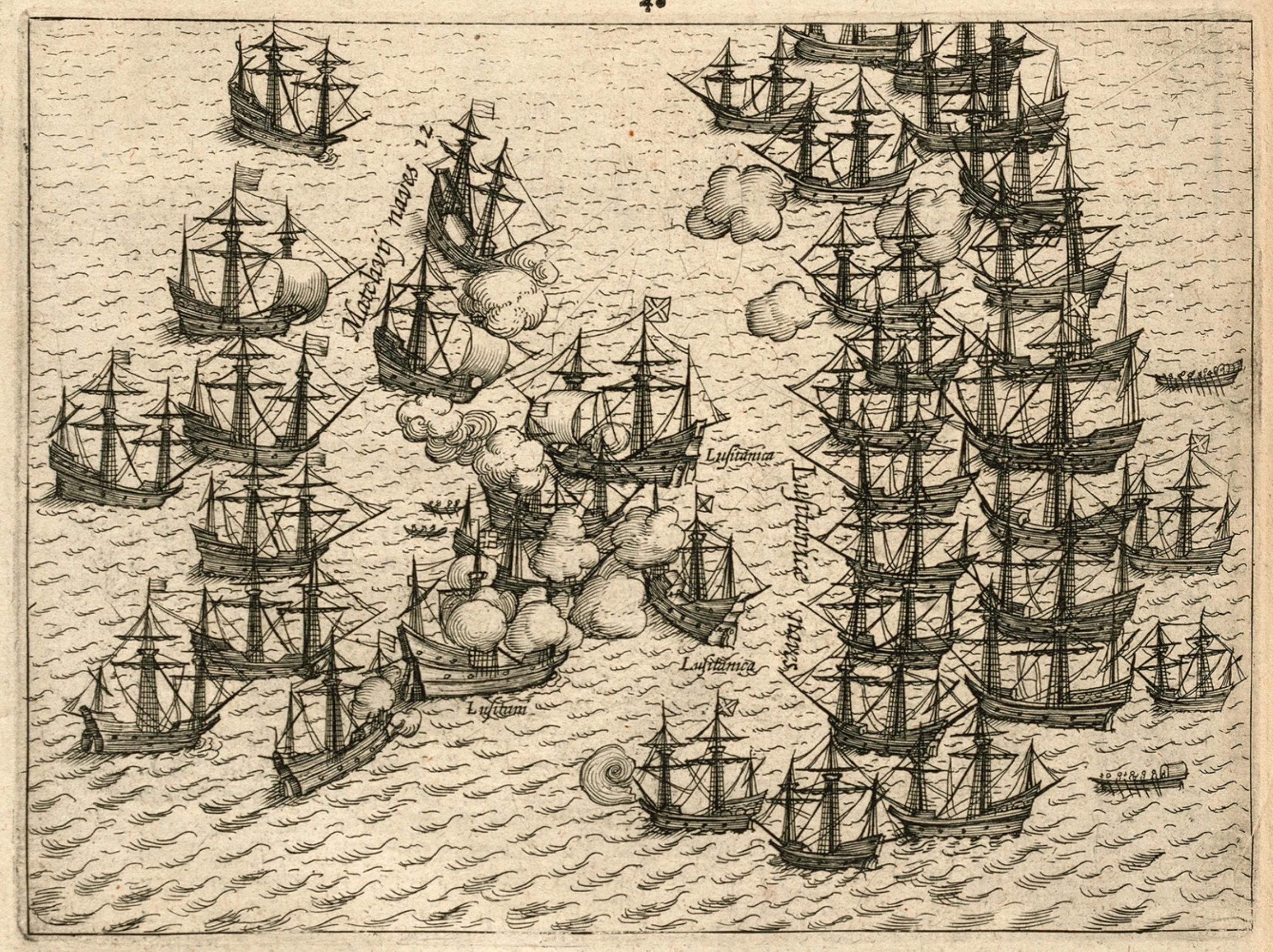
The Dutch fleet battling with the Portuguese armada as part of the Dutch–Portuguese War in 1606 to gain control of Malacca

In 1511, Malacca was conquered by Portugal, after which it was taken by the Dutch in 1641. In 1786, the British Empire established a presence in Malaya, when the Sultan of Kedah leased Penang Island to the British East India Company. The British obtained the town of Singapore in 1819, and in 1824 took control of Malacca following the Anglo-Dutch Treaty. By 1826, the British directly controlled Penang, Malacca, Singapore, and the island of Labuan, which they established as the crown colony of the Straits Settlements. By the 20th century, the states of Pahang, Selangor, Perak, and Negeri Sembilan, known together as the Federated Malay States, had British residents appointed to advise the Malay rulers, to whom the rulers were bound to defer by treaty. The remaining five states on the peninsula, known as the Unfederated Malay States, while not directly under British rule, also accepted British advisers around the turn of the 20th century. Development on the peninsula and Borneo were generally separate until the 19th century. Under British rule the immigration of Chinese and Indians to serve as labourers was encouraged. The area that is now Sabah came under British control as North Borneo when both the Sultan of Brunei and the Sultan of Sulu transferred their respective territorial rights of ownership, between 1877 and 1878. In 1842, Sarawak was ceded by the Sultan of Brunei to James Brooke, whose successors ruled as the White Rajahs over an independent kingdom until 1946, when it became a crown colony.

The Klang War (1867–1874) began as a dispute between Raja Abdullah and Raja Mahadi over the Klang chieftaincy, with Mahadi rejecting Abdullah's appointment by Sultan Abdul Samad of Selangor. The conflict drew in rival Chinese secret societies—the Ghee Hin Kongsi largely backing Mahadi and the Hai San Secret Society supporting Abdullah—as well as Bugis-descended and Malay chiefs who viewed Mahadi as more legitimate. Fighting spread after Mahadi captured the Klang Fort and Abdullah fled to Malacca, disrupting tin production, trade routes, and British commercial interests in the Klang Valley. At the same time, the neighbouring Larut Wars (1861–1874) between the Hai San and Ghee Hin in Perak similarly destabilised tin-rich districts and alarmed British merchants. Appeals from Malay chiefs for mediation combined with British concerns over regional disorder paved the way for formal intervention, culminating in the Pangkor Treaty of 1874 which established a system of British residents in the Malay states. As Frank Swettenham later wrote, "It is that though the circumstances demanded intervention, we came into the Malay States at the invitation of the Malay Rulers, to teach them a better form of administration."

In the Second World War, the Japanese Army invaded and occupied Malaya, North Borneo, Sarawak, and Singapore for over three years. During this time, ethnic tensions were raised and nationalism grew. Popular support for independence increased after Malaya was reconquered by Allied forces. Post-war British plans to unite the administration of Malaya under a single crown colony called the Malayan Union met with strong opposition from the Malays, who opposed the weakening of the Malay rulers and the granting of citizenship to the ethnic Chinese. The Malayan Union, established in 1946, and consisting of all the British possessions in the Malay Peninsula except for Singapore, was quickly dissolved and replaced on 1 February 1948 by the Federation of Malaya, which restored the autonomy of the rulers of the Malay states under British protection.

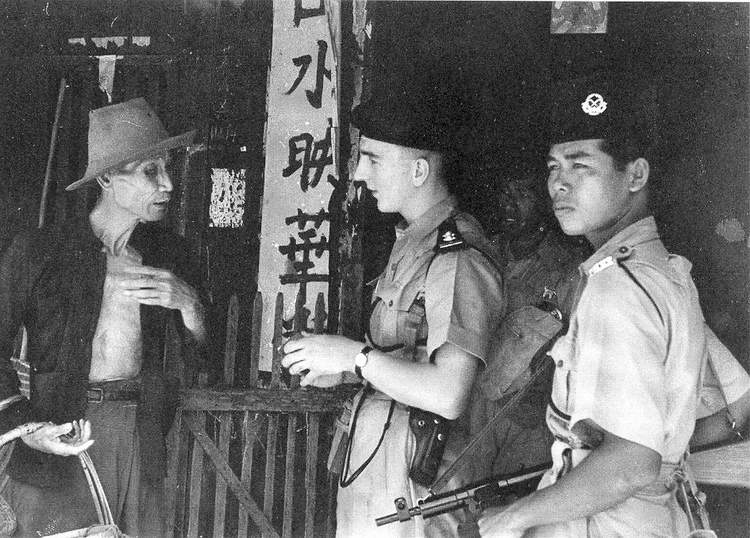
Malayan police officers questioning an ethnic Chinese civilian during the Malayan Emergency in 1949

During this time, the mostly ethnically Chinese rebels under the leadership of the Malayan Communist Party launched guerrilla operations designed to force the British out of Malaya. The Malayan Emergency (1948–1960) involved a long anti-insurgency campaign by Commonwealth troops in Malaya. On 31 August 1957, Malaya became an independent member of the Commonwealth of Nations. Subsequently, a comprehensive plan was devised to unite Malaya with the crown colonies of North Borneo (known as Sabah upon joining), Sarawak, and Singapore. The envisioned federation was originally intended to take place on 31 August 1963, to coincide with the commemoration of Malayan independence. However, due to the necessity of conducting a survey on the level of support for the federation in Sabah and Sarawak by the United Nations, as requested by opponents of the federation such as Indonesia's Sukarno and the Sarawak United Peoples' Party, the date of the federation was postponed until 16 September 1963.

The federation brought heightened tensions including a conflict with Indonesia as well as continual conflicts against the Communists in Borneo and the Malay Peninsula, which escalated to the Sarawak Communist Insurgency and Second Malayan Emergency together with several other issues such as the cross-border attacks into Sabah by Moro pirates from the southern islands of the Philippines, Singapore being separated from the Federation in 1965, and racial strife. This strife culminated in the 13 May race riots in 1969. After the riots, the controversial New Economic Policy was launched by Prime Minister Tun Abdul Razak, trying to increase the share of the economy held by the bumiputera. Under Prime Minister Mahathir Mohamad there was a period of rapid economic growth and urbanisation beginning in the 1980s. The economy shifted from being agriculturally based to one based on manufacturing and industry. Numerous mega-projects were completed, such as the Petronas Towers, the North–South Expressway, the Multimedia Super Corridor, and the new federal administrative capital of Putrajaya.

In the late 1990s, the Asian financial crisis impacted the country, nearly causing their currency, stock, and property markets to crash; however, they later recovered. The 1MDB scandal was a major global corruption scandal that implicated then-Prime Minister Najib Razak in 2015. The scandal contributed to the first change in the ruling political party since independence in the 2018 general election. In the 2020s, the country was gripped by a political crisis that coincided with health and economic crises caused by the COVID-19 pandemic. This was then followed by an earlier general election in November 2022, which resulted in the first hung parliament in the nation's history. On 24 November 2022, Anwar Ibrahim was sworn in as the 10th Prime Minister of Malaysia, leading a grand coalition government.

== Government and politics ==
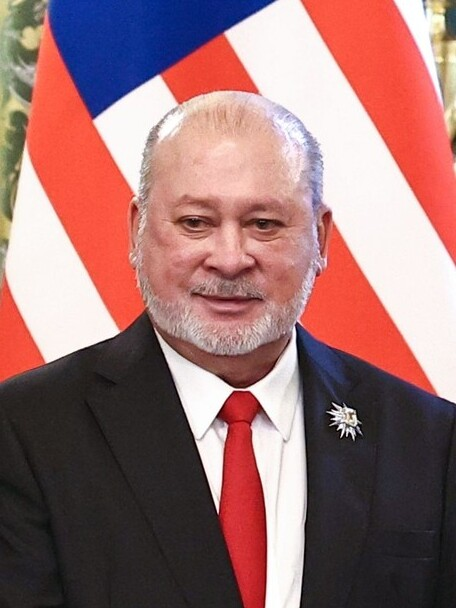
Ibrahim Iskandar
King

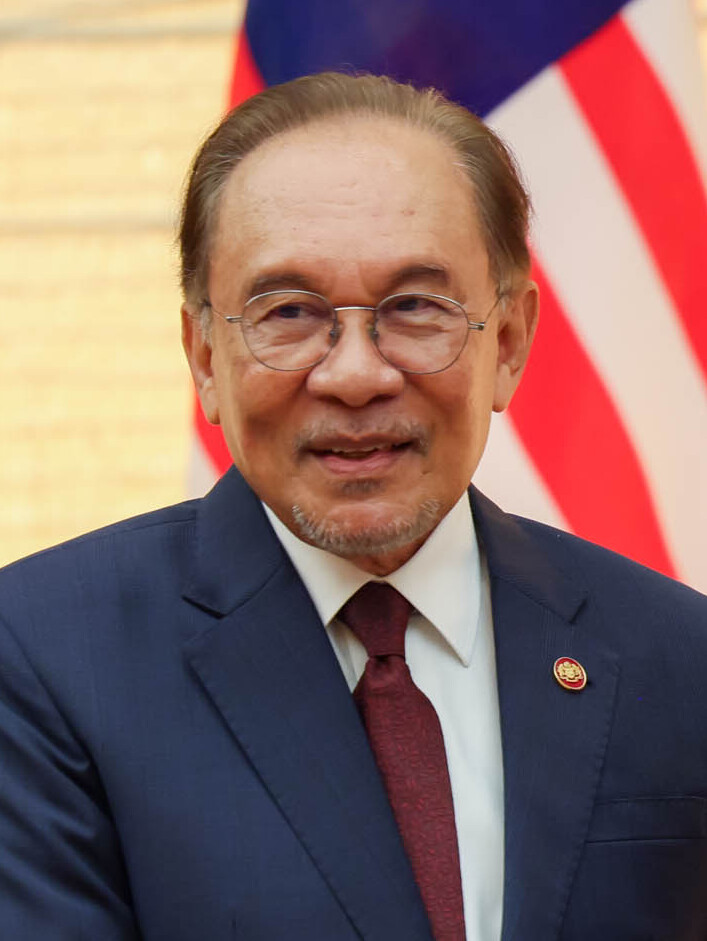
Anwar Ibrahim
Prime Minister

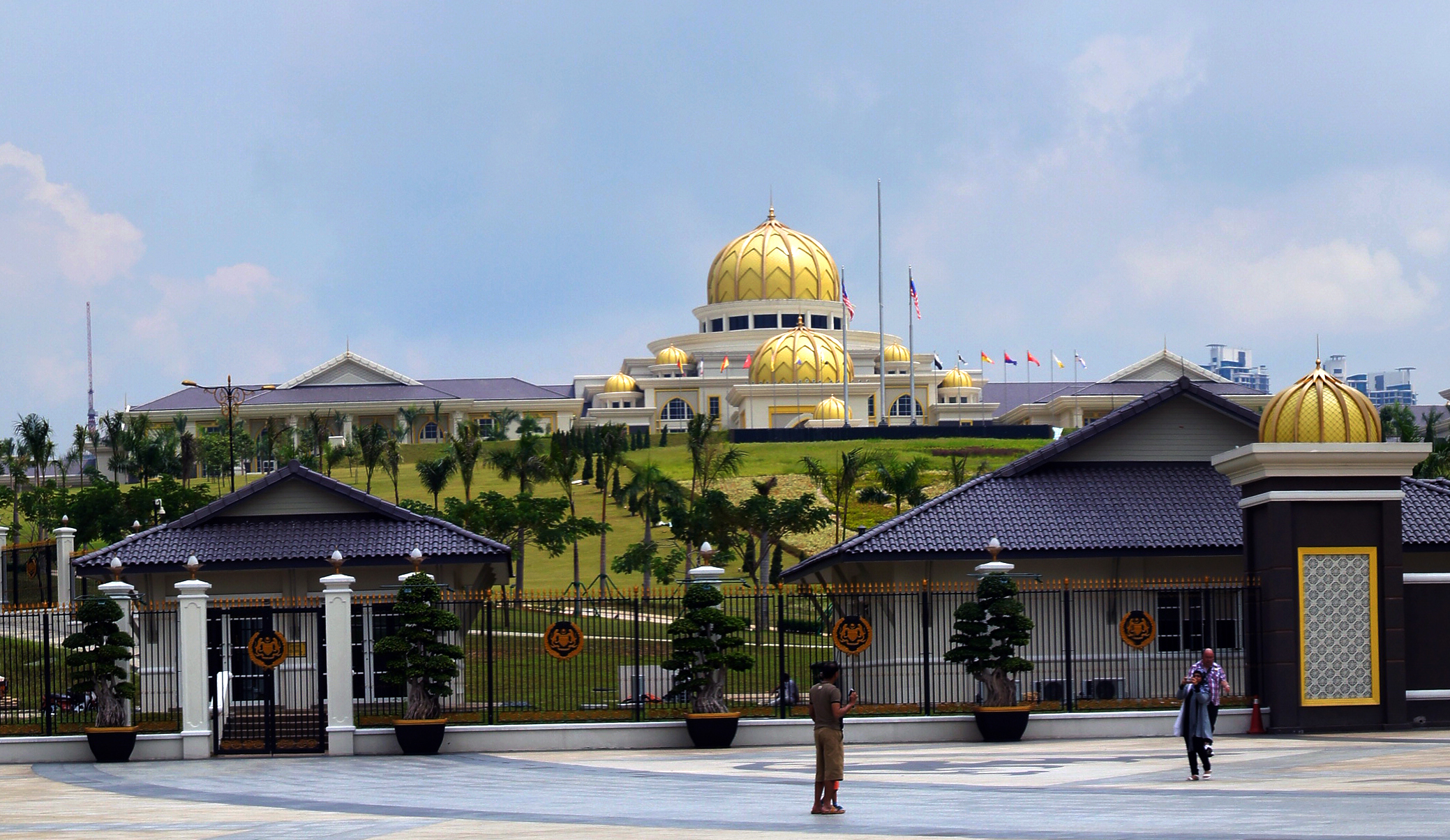
Istana Negara, the official residence and office of the King of Malaysia

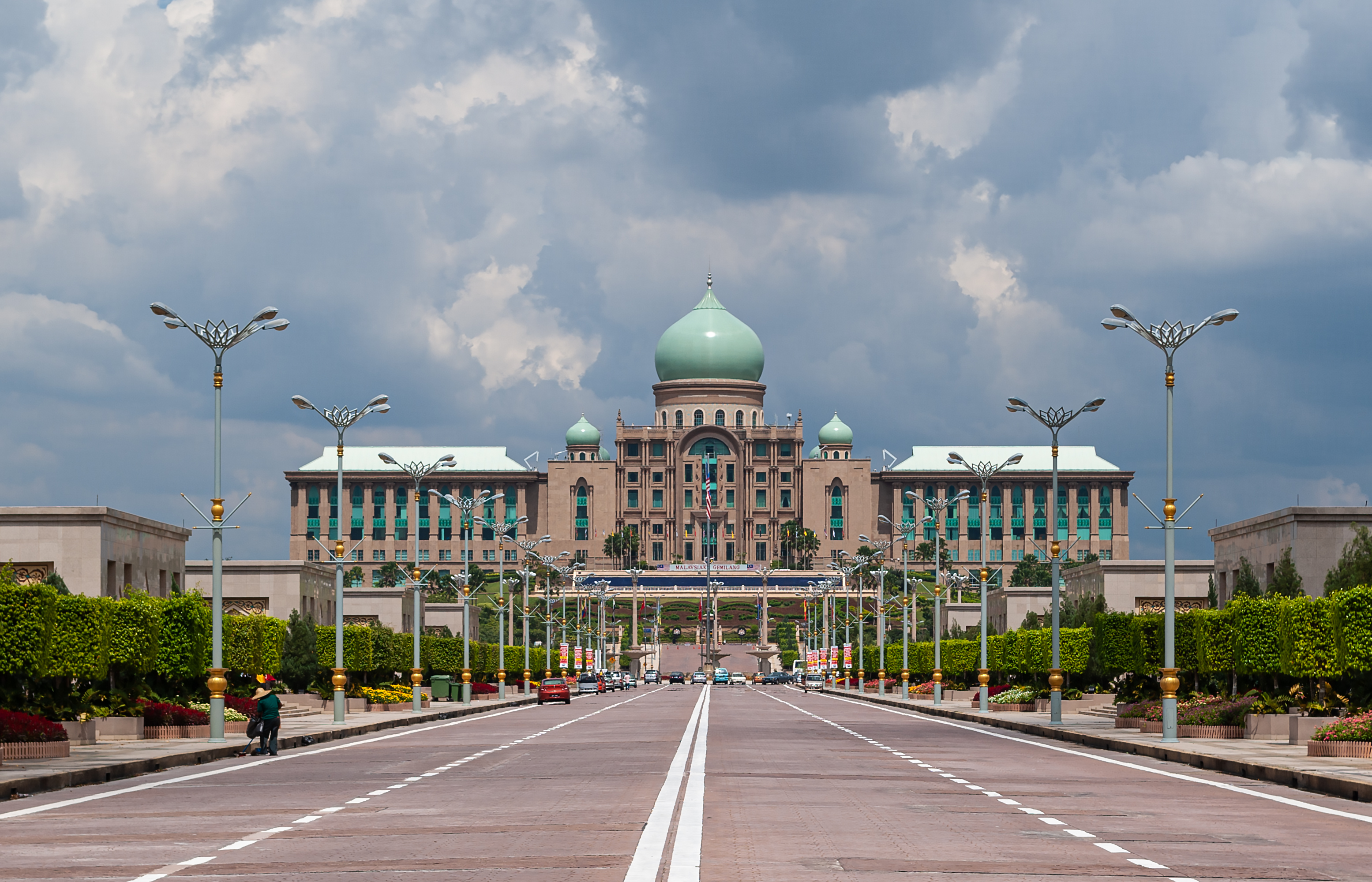
Perdana Putra, the office of the Prime Minister of Malaysia

Malaysia is a federal constitutional elective monarchy and the only federal country in Southeast Asia. The system of government is closely modelled on the Westminster parliamentary system, a legacy of British rule. The head of state is the King, whose official title is the Yang di-Pertuan Agong. The King is elected to a five-year term by and from among the nine hereditary rulers of the Malay states. The other four states, which have titular Governors, do not participate in the selection. By informal agreement the position is rotated among the nine, and has been held by Ibrahim Iskandar of Johor since 31 January 2024. The King's role has been largely ceremonial since changes to the constitution in 1994, picking ministers and members of the upper house.

Legislative power is divided between federal and state legislatures. The bicameral federal parliament consists of the lower house, the Dewan Rakyat (also known as the House of Representatives) and the upper house, the Dewan Negara (or the Senate). The 222-member House of Representatives is elected for a maximum term of five years from single-member constituencies. All 70 senators sit for three-year terms; 26 are elected by the 13 state assemblies, and the remaining 44 are appointed by the King upon the Prime Minister's recommendation. The parliament follows a multi-party system and the government is elected through a first-past-the-post system. Parliamentary elections are held at least once every five years. Before 2018, only registered voters aged 21 and above could vote for the members of the House of Representatives and, in most of the states, for the state legislative chamber. Voting is not mandatory. In July 2019, a bill to lower the voting age to 18 years old was officially passed.

Executive power is vested in the Cabinet, led by the Prime Minister. The prime minister must be a member of the Dewan Rakyat, who in the opinion of His Majesty the King, commands the support of a majority of members. The Cabinet is chosen from members of both houses of Parliament. The Prime Minister is both the head of cabinet and the head of government. As a result of the 2018 general election, Malaysia was governed by the Pakatan Harapan (PH) political alliance, although Prime Minister Mahathir Mohamad resigned amid a political crisis in 2020. In March 2020, the Perikatan Nasional (PN) coalition formed under Prime Minister Muhyiddin Yassin, before Muhyiddin lost majority support and was replaced by deputy Prime Minister Ismail Sabri Yaakob, a veteran politician from the United Malays National Organisation (UMNO), in August 2021. As a result of the 2022 Malaysian general election, a hung parliament was elected. Anwar Ibrahim of the PH coalition was appointed as the new Prime Minister to lead the coalition government of PH, Barisan Nasional, Gabungan Parti Sarawak, Gabungan Rakyat Sabah and several other political parties and independents. Meanwhile, PN, the only political coalition not in the coalition government, became the Opposition.

Malaysia's legal system is based on common law. Although the judiciary is theoretically independent, its independence has been called into question and the appointment of judges lacks accountability and transparency. The highest court in the judicial system is the Federal Court, followed by the Court of Appeal and two high courts, one for Peninsular Malaysia and one for East Malaysia. Malaysia also has a special court to hear cases brought by or against royalty.

Race is a significant force in politics. Affirmative actions such as the New Economic Policy and the National Development Policy which superseded it, were implemented to advance the standing of the bumiputera, consisting of Malays and the indigenous tribes who are considered the original inhabitants of Malaysia, over non-bumiputera such as Malaysian Chinese and Malaysian Indians. These policies provide preferential treatment to bumiputera in employment, education, scholarships, business, and access to cheaper housing and assisted savings. However, it has generated greater interethnic resentment. There is ongoing debate over whether the laws and society of Malaysia should reflect Islamism or secularism. Islamic criminal laws passed by the Pan-Malaysian Islamic Party with the support of UMNO state assemblymen in the state legislative assembly of Kelantan have been unenforced by the federal government on the basis that criminal laws are the responsibility of the federal government.

After UMNO lost power at the 2018 Malaysian general election, Malaysia's ranking increased by 9 places in the 2019 Democracy Index to 43rd compared to the previous year; the country is classified as a 'flawed democracy'. Malaysia's ranking in the 2020 Press Freedom Index increased by 22 places to 101st compared to the previous year, making it one of two countries in Southeast Asia without a 'Difficult situation' or 'Very Serious situation' with regards to press freedom. However, it fell 18 places the following year due to the policies of the PN government.

Malaysia is marked at 48th and 62nd place according to the 2021 Corruption Perceptions Index, indicating above-average levels of corruption. Freedom House noted Malaysia as "partly free" in its 2018 survey. A lawsuit filed by the United States Department of Justice alleged that at least $3.5 billion involving former prime minister Najib Razak had been stolen from Malaysia's 1MDB state-owned fund, known as the 1Malaysia Development Berhad scandal. As of 2025, it is ranked 13th on the Global Peace Index.

=== Administrative divisions ===
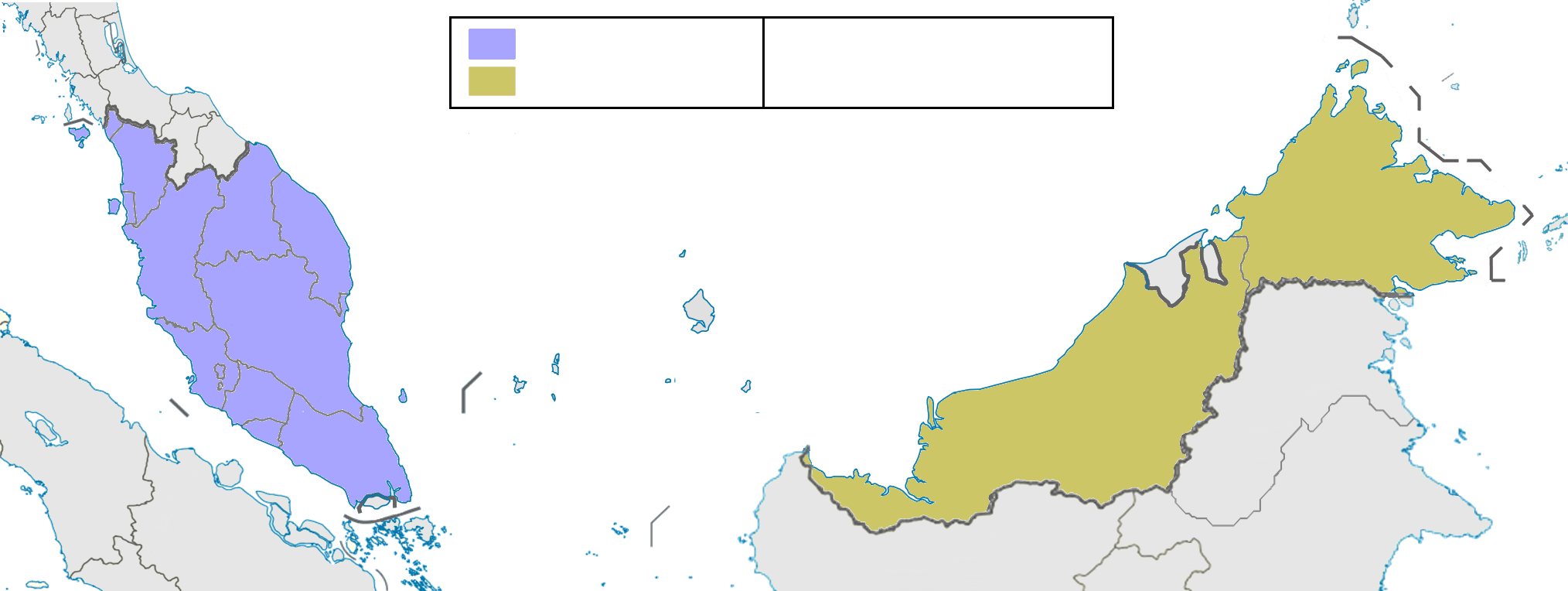

Malaysia is a federation of 13 states and three federal territories. Out of these, 11 states and two federal territories are in Peninsular Malaysia, whereas the other two states and one federal territory comprise East Malaysia.

The country has three tiers of government—federal, state, and local. Governance of the states is divided between the federal and the state governments, with different powers reserved for each, and the federal government has direct administration of the federal territories. Each state has a unicameral State Legislative Assembly whose members are elected from single-member constituencies. State governments are led by Chief Ministers, who are state assembly members from the majority party in the assembly. In each of the states with a hereditary ruler, the Chief Minister is normally required to be a Malay, appointed by the ruler upon the recommendation of the Prime Minister. Until 2018, state elections were held concurrently with the general election by convention, except for those in Sarawak. Following the 2020–2022 political crisis, only Pahang, Perak and Perlis opted to conduct their state elections simultaneously with the general elections.

Positioned below the federal and state governments, local governments represent the lowest tier of governance in Malaysia. As of 2024, Malaysia is divided between 19 cities, 40 municipalities, 91 district-level councils, and four statutory agencies. While the federal constitution assigns local authorities to the exclusive jurisdiction of state governments, in practice, the federal Ministry of Housing and Local Government oversees the regulation of local laws and policies. Mayors (or presidents for municipal and district councils) and councillors are appointed by the respective state governments, or in the case of the federal territories, by the federal government.

Federal laws assign land matters, including the delineation of districts, to the purview of state governments. Except Perlis and the federal territories, each state is divided into districts, which are further subdivided into mukims. In Sabah and Sarawak, districts are grouped into divisions. In contrast to local governments that manage municipal administration and infrastructure development, districts are solely utilised for land taxation.

The 13 states are based on historical Malay kingdoms, and 9 of the 11 Peninsular states, known as the Malay states, retain their royal families. The King is elected by and from the nine rulers to serve a five-year term. This King appoints governors serving a four-year term for the states without monarchies, after consultations with the chief minister of that state. Each state has its written constitution. Sabah and Sarawak have considerably more autonomy than the other states, most notably having separate immigration policies and controls, and unique residency status. Federal intervention in state affairs, lack of development, and disputes over oil royalties have occasionally led to statements about secession from leaders in several states such as Penang, Johor, Kelantan, Sabah and Sarawak, although these have not been followed up and no serious independence movements exist.

States

A list of 13 states and each state capital (in parentheses):

1. Johor (Johor Bahru)
2. Kedah (Alor Setar)
3. Kelantan (Kota Bharu)
4. Malacca (Malacca City)
5. Negeri Sembilan (Seremban)
6. Pahang (Kuantan)
7. Penang (George Town)
8. Perak (Ipoh)
9. Perlis (Kangar)
10. Selangor (Shah Alam)
11. Sabah (Kota Kinabalu)
12. Sarawak (Kuching)
13. Terengganu (Kuala Terengganu)

Federal territories

1. Federal Territory of Kuala Lumpur
2. Federal Territory of Labuan (Victoria)
3. Federal Territory of Putrajaya

=== Foreign relations and military ===
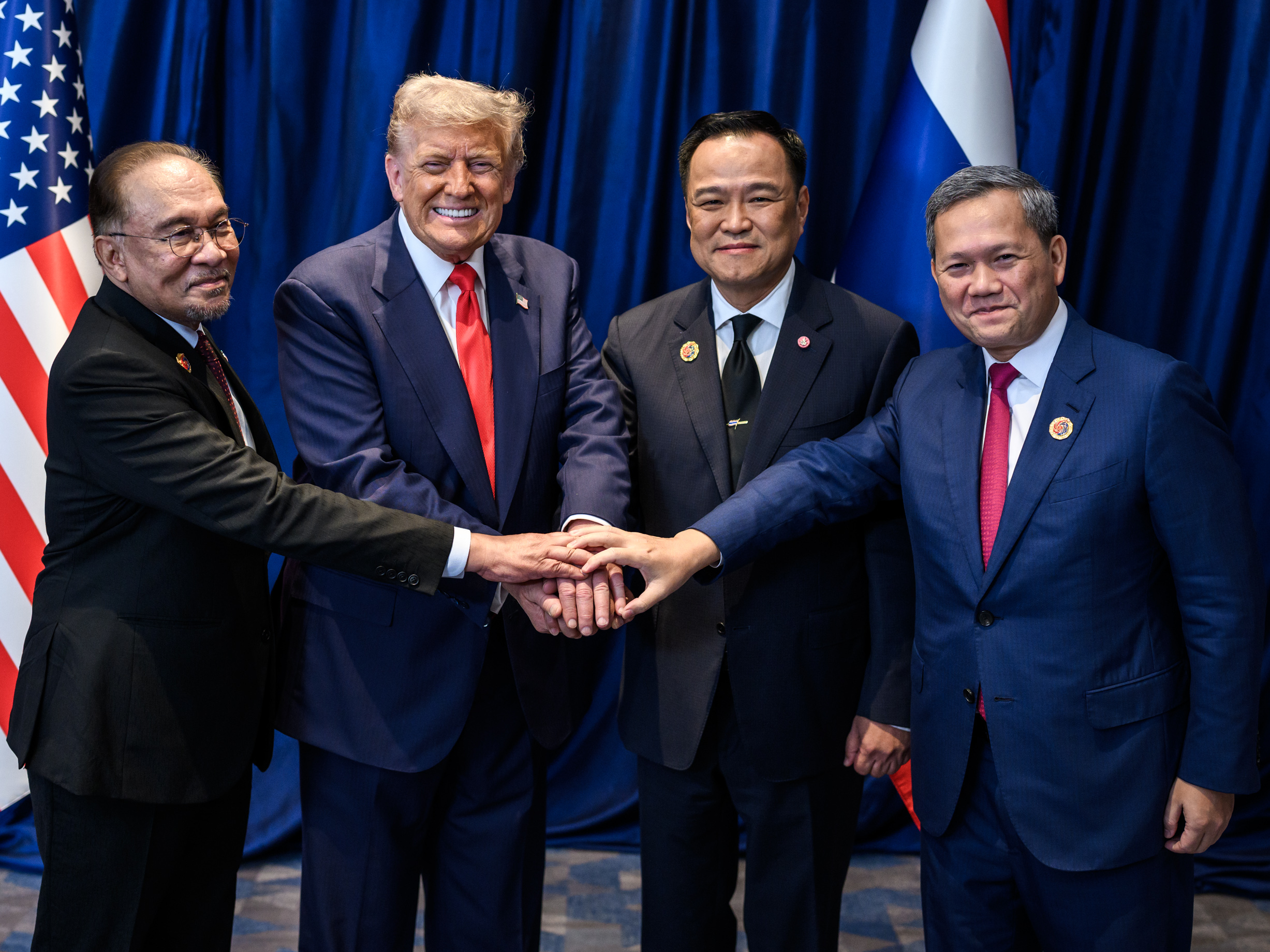
(L-R) Malaysian Prime Minister Anwar Ibrahim, US President Donald Trump, Thai Prime Minister Anutin Charnvirakul and Cambodian Prime Minister Hun Manet after signing the Kuala Lumpur Peace Accord, which took place during the 47th ASEAN Summit, 26 October 2025

A founding member of ASEAN and OIC, the country participates in many international organisations such as the United Nations (UN), APEC, the D-8 Organization for Economic Cooperation, and NAM. It has chaired ASEAN, OIC, and NAM in the past. A former British colony, it is also a member of the Commonwealth. Kuala Lumpur was the site of the first EAC in 2005.

Malaysia's foreign policy is officially based on the principle of neutrality and maintaining peaceful relations with all countries, regardless of their political system. The government attaches a high priority to the security and stability of Southeast Asia, and seeks to further develop relations with other countries in the region. Historically the government has tried to portray Malaysia as a progressive Islamic nation while strengthening relations with other Islamic states. A strong tenet of Malaysia's policy is national sovereignty and right of a country to control its domestic affairs. Malaysia signed the UN treaty on the Prohibition of Nuclear Weapons.

The Spratly Islands are disputed by many states in the area, and a large portion of the South China Sea is claimed by China. Unlike its neighbours of Vietnam and the Philippines, Malaysia historically avoided conflicts with China. However, after the encroachment of Chinese ships in Malaysian territorial waters, and breach of airspace by their military aircraft, Malaysia has become active in condemning China. Brunei and Malaysia in 2009 announced an end to claims of each other's land, and committed to resolve issues related to their maritime borders. The Philippines has a dormant claim to the eastern part of Sabah. Singapore's land reclamation has caused tensions, and minor maritime and land border disputes exist with Indonesia.

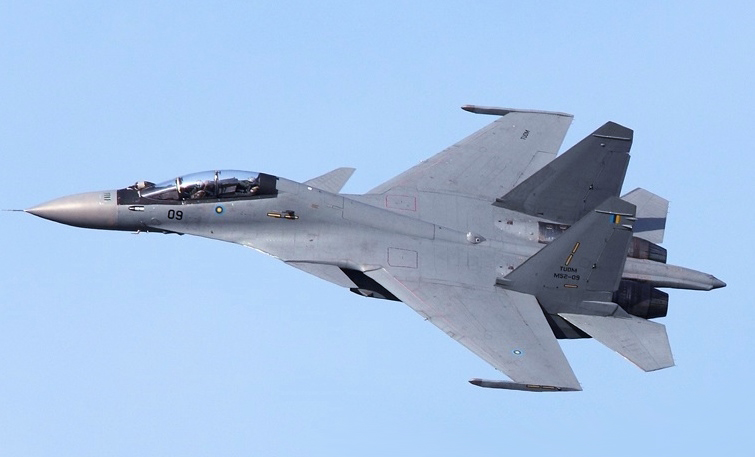
Sukhoi Su-30MKM of the RMAF

The Malaysian Armed Forces has three branches: the Malaysian Army, Royal Malaysian Navy and the Royal Malaysian Air Force. There is no conscription, and the required age for voluntary military service is 18. The military uses 1.5% of the country's GDP, and employs 1.23% of Malaysia's manpower. Malaysian peacekeeping forces of MALBATT have contributed to many U.N. peacekeeping missions, such as in Congo, Iran–Iraq, Namibia, Cambodia, Bosnia and Herzegovina, Somalia, Kosovo, East Timor, and Lebanon.

The Five Power Defence Arrangements is a regional security initiative that has been in place for almost 40 years. It involves joint military exercises held among Malaysia, Singapore, Australia, New Zealand, and the United Kingdom. Joint exercises and war games have also been held with Brunei, China, India, Indonesia, Japan, and the United States. Malaysia, Philippines, Thailand, and Vietnam have agreed to host joint security force exercises to secure their maritime border and tackle issues such as illegal immigration, piracy, and smuggling. Previously there were fears that extremist militant activities in the Muslim areas of the southern Philippines and southern Thailand would spill over into Malaysia. Because of this, Malaysia began to increase its border security.

=== Human rights ===
Homosexuality is illegal in Malaysia, and authorities have imposed punishments such as caning and imprisonment. Human trafficking and sex trafficking in Malaysia are significant problems. There have also been cases of vigilante executions and beatings against LGBT individuals in Malaysia. The illegality of homosexuality in Malaysia has also been the forefront of Anwar Ibrahim's sodomy trials, which Anwar has called politically motivated, a characterisation supported by the Working Group on Arbitrary Detention, along with Amnesty International and the Human Rights Watch.

The death penalty is in use for serious crimes such as murder, terrorism, and drug trafficking, for some of which it was once mandatory. However, in July 2023, following the passing of the Abolition of Mandatory Death Penalty Act 2023, mandatory death penalty was abolished for all crimes in Malaysia, thereby allowing judges to impose the capital punishment at their own discretion and on a case-by-case basis. The new law also abolished all natural life imprisonment, replacing it with 30 to 40 years prison terms instead.

== Geography ==
Topographic map of Malaysia; Mount Kinabalu is the highest summit in the country.

Malaysia is the 66th largest country by total land area, with a total area of 330,803 km^{2} (127,724 sq mi). West Malaysia shares land borders with Thailand, while East Malaysia shares land borders with Indonesia and Brunei. Singapore is separated from the West by the Straits of Johor and is linked to it by a narrow causeway and a bridge. The country also shares maritime boundaries with Indonesia, Vietnam and the Philippines. The land borders are defined in large part by geological features such as the Perlis River, the Golok River and the Pagalayan Canal, whilst some of the maritime boundaries are the subject of ongoing contention. Brunei forms what is almost an enclave in Malaysia, with the state of Sarawak dividing it into two parts. Malaysia is the only country with territory on both the Asian mainland and the Malay Archipelago. The Strait of Malacca, lying between Sumatra and Peninsular Malaysia, is one of the most important thoroughfares in global commerce, carrying 40% of the world's trade. The southernmost point of mainland Asia is located at Tanjung Piai, in the state of Johor.

The two parts of Malaysia, separated from each other by the South China Sea, share a largely similar landscape in that both Peninsular and East Malaysia feature coastal plains rising to hills and mountains. Peninsular Malaysia, containing 40% of Malaysia's land area, extends 740 km (460 mi) from north to south, and its maximum width is 322 km (200 mi). It is divided between its east and west coasts by the Titiwangsa Mountains, rising to a peak elevation of 2,183 metres (7,162 ft) at Mount Korbu, part of a series of mountain ranges running down the centre of the peninsula. These mountains are heavily forested, and mainly composed of granite and other igneous rocks. Much of it has been eroded, creating a karst landscape. The range is the origin of some of Peninsular Malaysia's river systems. The coastal plains surrounding the peninsula reach a maximum width of 50 kilometres (31 mi), and the peninsula's coastline is nearly 1,931 km (1,200 mi) long, although harbours are only available on the western side.

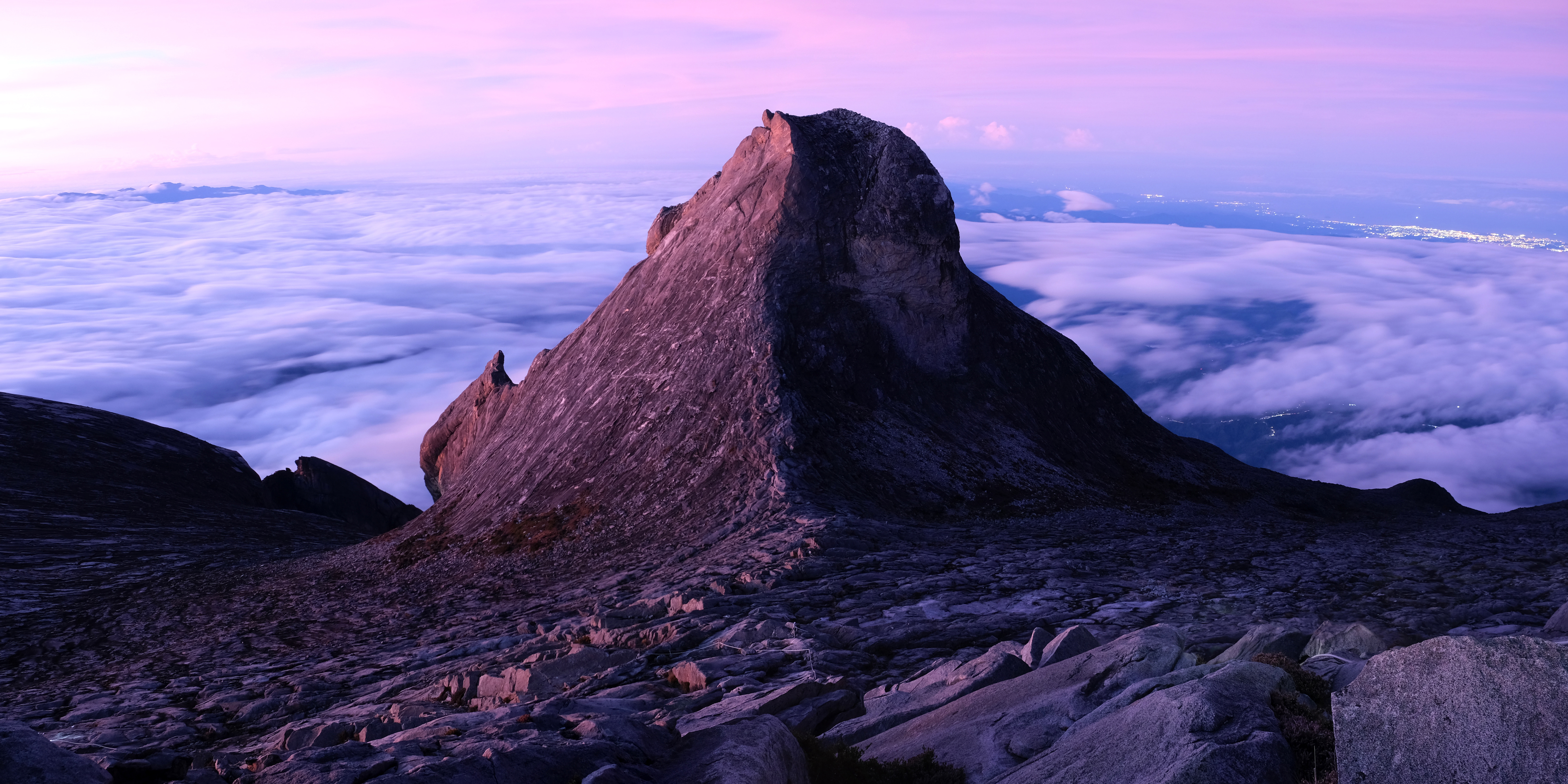
View towards St. John's Peak before sunrise on Mount Kinabalu, with the distant city lights of Kota Kinabalu visible far right, Sabah, Borneo

East Malaysia, on the island of Borneo, has a coastline of 2,607 km (1,620 mi). It is divided between coastal regions, hills and valleys, and a mountainous interior. The Crocker Range extends northwards from Sarawak, dividing the state of Sabah. It is the location of the 4,095 m (13,435 ft) high Mount Kinabalu, the tallest mountain in Malaysia. Mount Kinabalu is located in the Kinabalu National Park, which is protected as one of the four UNESCO World Heritage Sites in Malaysia. The highest mountain ranges form the border between Malaysia and Indonesia. Sarawak contains the Mulu Caves, the largest cave system in the world, in the Gunung Mulu National Park, another World Heritage Site. Also in Sarawak is the Rajang, the largest river in Malaysia.

Around the two halves of Malaysia are numerous islands, the largest of which is Banggi. The local climate is equatorial and characterised by the annual southwest (April to October) and northeast (October to February) monsoons. The temperature is moderated by the presence of the surrounding oceans. Humidity is usually high, and the average annual rainfall is 250 cm (98 in). The climates of the Peninsula and the East differ, as the climate on the peninsula is directly affected by wind from the mainland, as opposed to the more maritime weather of the East. Local climates can be divided into three regions, highland, lowland, and coastal. Climate change will cause sea level rise and increased rainfall, increasing flood risks and leading to droughts.

=== Biodiversity and conservation ===
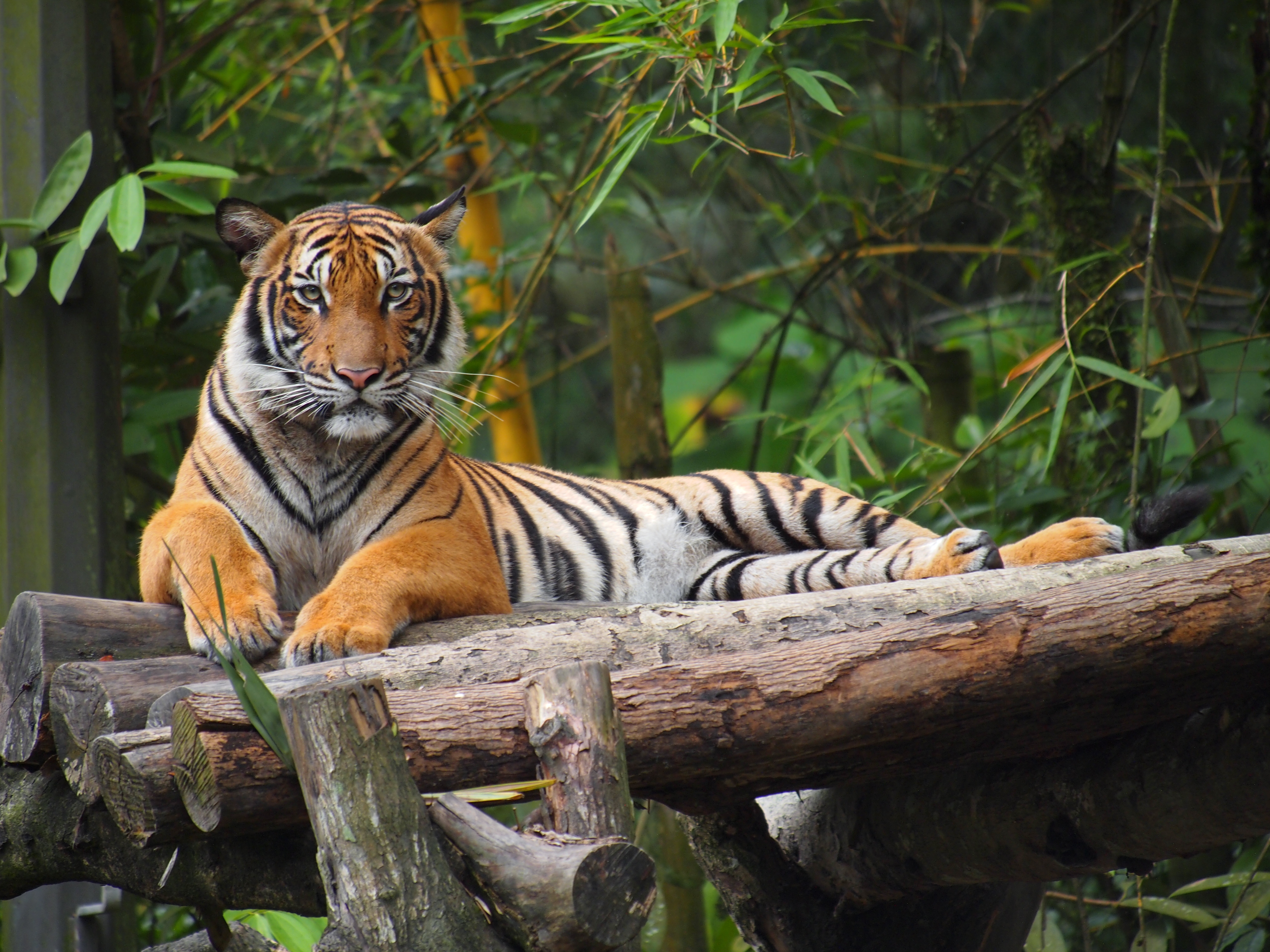
A Malayan tiger in the National Zoo of Malaysia

Malaysia signed the Rio Convention on Biological Diversity on 12 June 1993, and became a party to the convention on 24 June 1994. It has subsequently produced a National Biodiversity Strategy and Action Plan, which was received by the convention on 16 April 1998. The country is megadiverse with a high number of species and high levels of endemism. It is estimated to contain 20% of the world's animal species. High levels of endemism are found on the diverse forests of Borneo's mountains, as species are isolated from each other by lowland forest.

There are about 210 mammal species in the country. Over 620 species of birds have been recorded in Peninsular Malaysia, with many endemic to the mountains there. A high number of endemic bird species are also found in Malaysian Borneo. 250 reptile species have been recorded in the country, with about 150 species of snakes and 80 species of lizards. There are about 150 species of frogs, and thousands of insect species. The Exclusive economic zone of Malaysia is 334,671 km^{2} (129,217 sq mi) and 1.5 times larger than its land area. It is mainly in the South China Sea. Some of its waters are in the Coral Triangle, a biodiversity hotspot. The waters around the island of Sipadan are the most biodiverse in the world. Bordering East Malaysia, the Sulu Sea is a biodiversity hotspot, with around 600 coral species and 1200 fish species. The unique biodiversity of Malaysian Caves always attracts lovers of ecotourism from all over the world.

Nearly 4,000 species of fungi, including lichen-forming species, have been recorded from Malaysia. Of the two fungal groups with the largest number of species in Malaysia, the Ascomycota and their asexual states have been surveyed in some habitats (decaying wood, marine, and freshwater ecosystems, as parasites of some plants, and as agents of biodegradation), but have not been or have been only poorly surveyed in other habitats (as endobionts, in soils, on dung, as human and animal pathogens); the Basidiomycota are only partly surveyed: bracket fungi, mushrooms and toadstools have been studied, but Malaysian rust and smut fungi remain little known. Without a doubt, many more fungal species in Malaysia are yet to be recorded, and it is likely that many of those, when found, will be new to science.

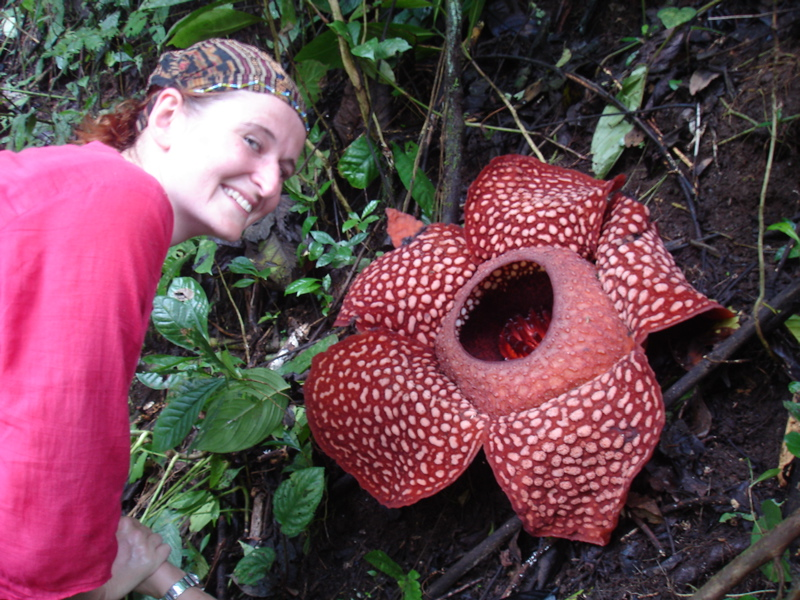
Some species of Rafflesia can grow up to 1 m (3 ft 3 in) in diameter, making them the largest flowers in the world.

About two-thirds of Malaysia was covered in forest as of 2007, with some forests believed to be 130 million years old. The forests are dominated by dipterocarps. Lowland forest covers areas below 760 m (2,490 ft), and formerly East Malaysia was covered in such rainforest, which is supported by its hot wet climate. There are around 14,500 species of flowering plants and trees. Besides rainforests, there are over 1,425 km^{2} (550 sq mi) of mangroves in Malaysia, and a large amount of peat forest. At higher altitudes, oaks, chestnuts, and rhododendrons replace dipterocarps. There are an estimated 8,500 species of vascular plants in Peninsular Malaysia, with another 15,000 in the East. The forests of East Malaysia are estimated to be the habitat of around 2,000 tree species, and are one of the most biodiverse areas in the world, with 240 different species of trees every hectare. These forests host many members of the Rafflesia genus, the largest flowers in the world, with a maximum diameter of 1 m (3 ft 3 in).

Logging, along with cultivation practices, has devastated tree cover, causing severe environmental degradation in the country. Over 80% of Sarawak's rainforest has been logged. Floods in East Malaysia have been worsened by the loss of trees, and over 60% of the peninsula's forests have been cleared. With current rates of deforestation, mainly for the palm oil industry, the forests are predicted to be extinct by 2020. Deforestation is a major problem for animals, fungi and plants, having caused species such as Begonia eiromischa to go extinct. Most remaining forest is found inside reserves and national parks. Habitat destruction has proved a threat for marine life. Illegal fishing is another major threat, with fishing methods such as dynamite fishing and poisoning depleting marine ecosystems. Leatherback turtle numbers have dropped by 98% since the 1950s. Hunting has also been an issue for some animals, with overconsumption and the use of animal parts for profit endangering many animals, from marine life to tigers. Marine life is also detrimentally affected by uncontrolled tourism.

The Malaysian government aims to balance economic growth with environmental protection, but has been accused of favouring big business over the environment. Some state governments are now trying to counter the environmental impact and pollution created by deforestation; and the federal government is trying to cut logging by 10% each year. A total of 28 national parks have been established, 23 in East Malaysia and five in the peninsula. Tourism has been limited in biodiverse areas such as the island of Sipadan. Wildlife trafficking is a large issue, and the Malaysian government has held talks with the governments of Brunei and Indonesia to standardise anti-trafficking laws.

== Economy ==
Development of real GDP per capita, 1820 to 2018

Malaysia is a relatively open state-oriented and newly industrialised market economy. It has the world's 34th-largest economy by nominal GDP and the 28th-largest by PPP. In 2017, the large service sector contributed to 53.6% of total GDP, the industrial sector 37.6%, and the small agricultural sector roughly 8.8%. Malaysia has a low official unemployment rate of 3.4% as of 2024. Its foreign exchange reserves are the world's 24th-largest. It has a labour force of about 15 million, which is the world's 34th-largest. Malaysia's large automotive industry ranks as the world's 22nd-largest by production.

Malaysia is the world's 23rd-largest exporter and 25th-largest importer. However, economic inequalities exist between different ethnic groups. The Chinese make up about one-quarter of the population, but account for 70% of the country's market capitalisation. Chinese businesses in Malaysia are part of the larger bamboo network, a network of overseas Chinese businesses in the Southeast Asian market sharing common family and cultural ties.

International trade, facilitated by the shipping route in adjacent Strait of Malacca, and manufacturing are the key sectors. Malaysia is an exporter of natural and agricultural resources, and petroleum is a major export. Malaysia is member of the OPEC+ cartel. Malaysia has once been the largest producer of tin, rubber and palm oil in the world. Manufacturing has a large influence in the country's economy, although Malaysia's economic structure has been moving away from it. Malaysia remains one of the world's largest producers of palm oil.

Tourism is the third-largest contributor to Malaysia's GDP, after the manufacturing and commodities sectors. In 2019, the sector contributed about 15.9% to the total GDP. According to the World Tourism Organization, Malaysia was the fourteenth-most visited country in the world, and the fourth-most visited country in Asia in 2019, with over 26.1 million visits. Malaysia was ranked 38th in the Travel and Tourism Competitiveness Report 2019. Its international tourism receipts in 2019 amounted to $19.8 billion.

The country has developed into a centre of Islamic banking and has the highest number of female workers in that industry. Knowledge-based services are also expanding. In 2020, Malaysia exported high-tech products worth $92.1 billion, the second-highest in ASEAN, after Singapore. Malaysia was ranked 34th in the Global Innovation Index in 2025, and 32nd in the Global Competitiveness Report in 2022.

=== Infrastructure ===
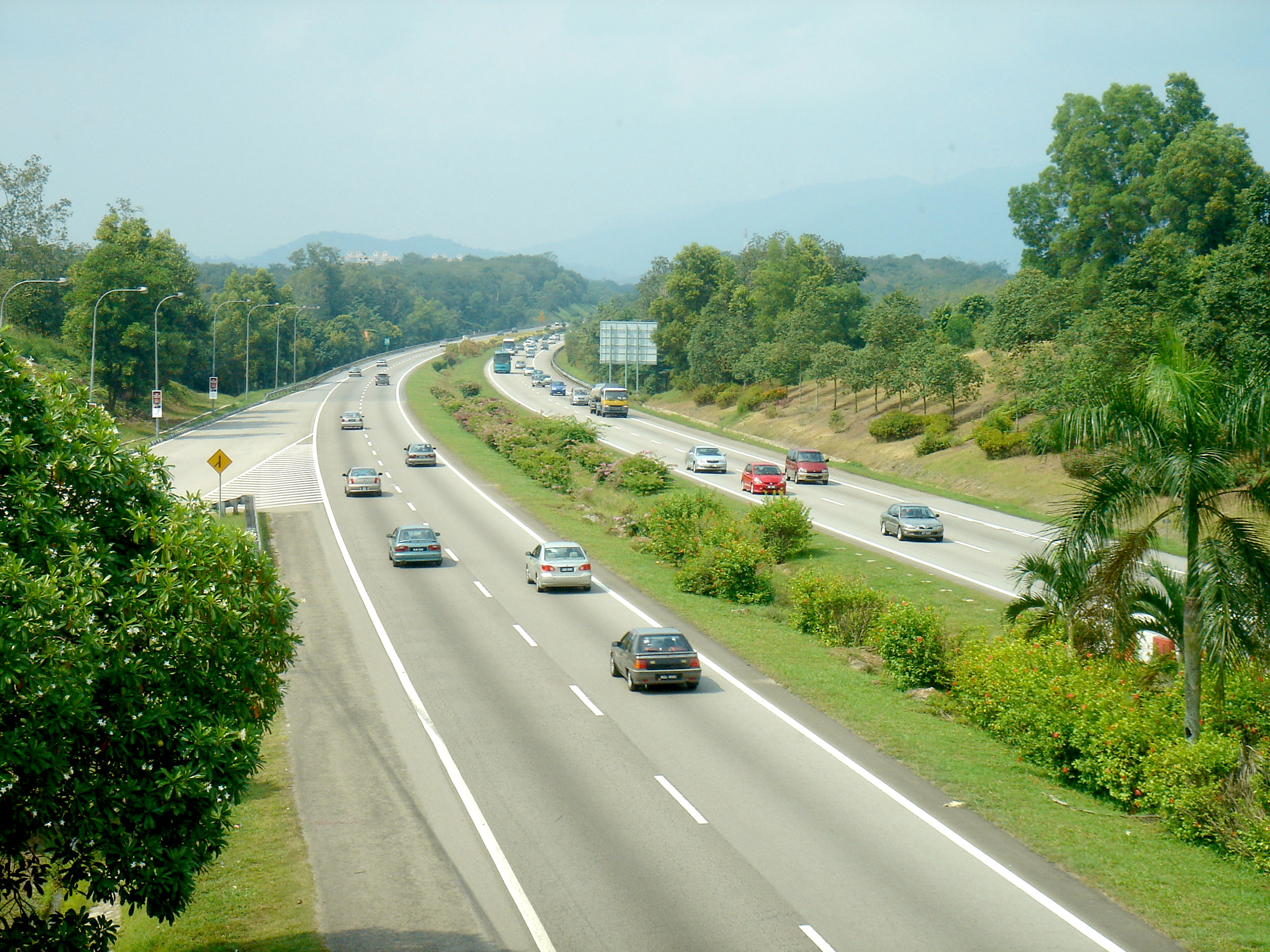
North–South Expressway

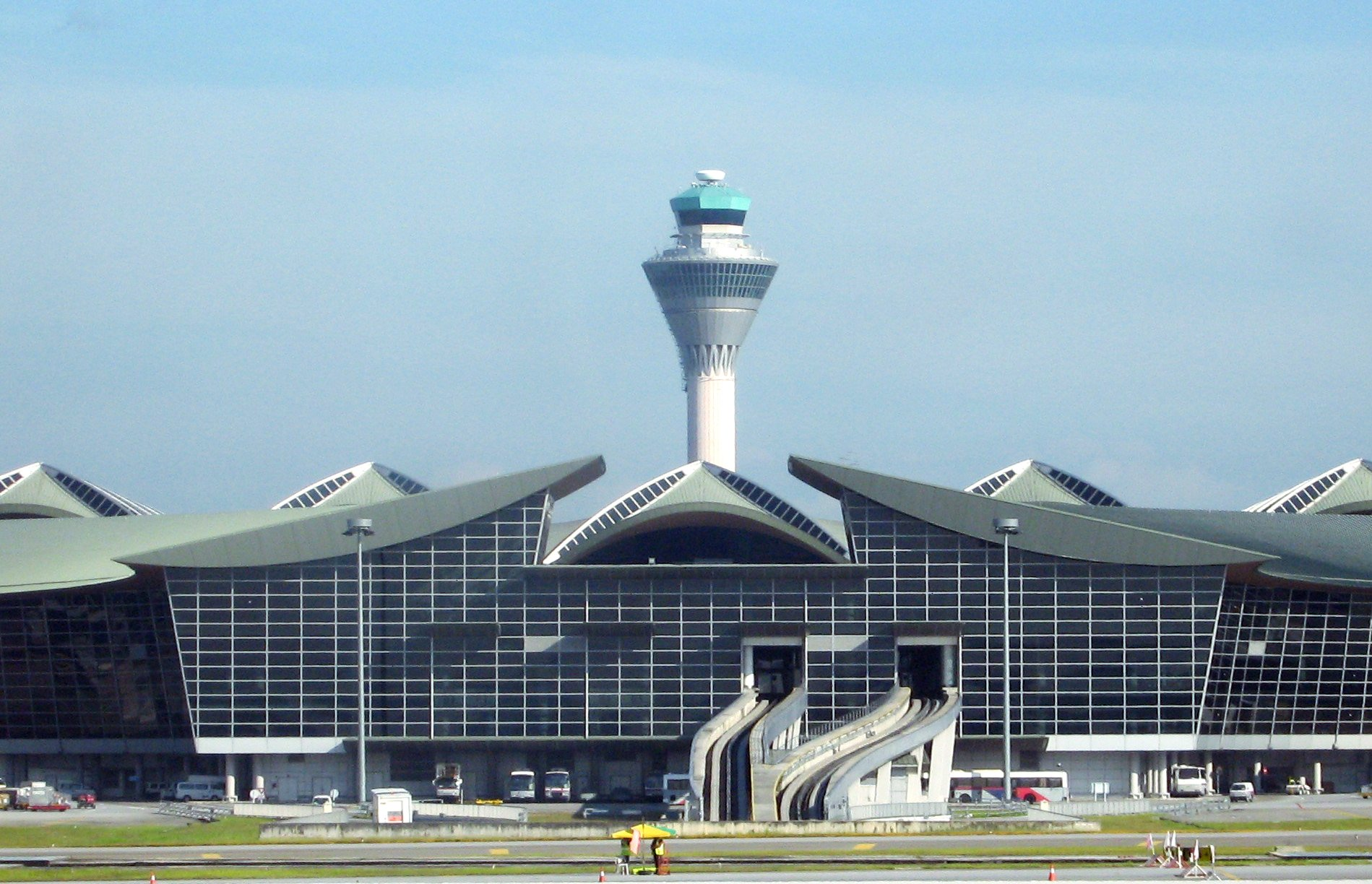
Kuala Lumpur International Airport

Railway transport in Malaysia is state-run, and spans some 2,783 kilometres (1,729 mi). As of 2016, Malaysia has the world's 26th-largest road network, with some 238,823 kilometres (148,398 mi) of roads. Malaysia's inland waterways are the world's 22nd-longest, and total 7,200 km (4,474 mi). Among Malaysia's 114 airports, the busiest one is Kuala Lumpur International Airport (KLIA), located in the Sepang District; it is also the 12th-busiest airport in Asia. Among the seven federal ports, the major one is Port Klang, which is the 13th-busiest container port. Malaysia's flag carrier is Malaysia Airlines, providing international and domestic air services.

Malaysia's telecommunications network is second only to Singapore's in Southeast Asia, with 4.7 million fixed-line subscribers and more than 30 million cellular subscribers. There are 200 industrial parks along with specialised parks such as Technology Park Malaysia and Kulim Hi-Tech Park. Fresh water is available to over 95% of the population, with groundwater accounting for 90% of the freshwater resources. Although rural areas have been the focus of great development, they still lag behind areas such as the West Coast of Peninsular Malaysia. The telecommunication network, although strong in urban areas, is less available to the rural population.

Malaysia's energy infrastructure sector is largely dominated by Tenaga Nasional, the largest electric utility company in Southeast Asia. Customers in Peninsular Malaysia are connected to electricity through the National Grid. The other two electric utility companies in the country are Sarawak Energy and Sabah Electricity. In 2013, Malaysia's total power generation capacity was over 29,728 megawatts. Total electricity generation was 140,985.01 GWh and total electricity consumption was 116,087.51 GWh. Energy production in Malaysia is largely based on oil and natural gas, owing to Malaysia's oil and natural gas reserves, which are the fourth largest in the Asia-Pacific region.

== Demographics ==
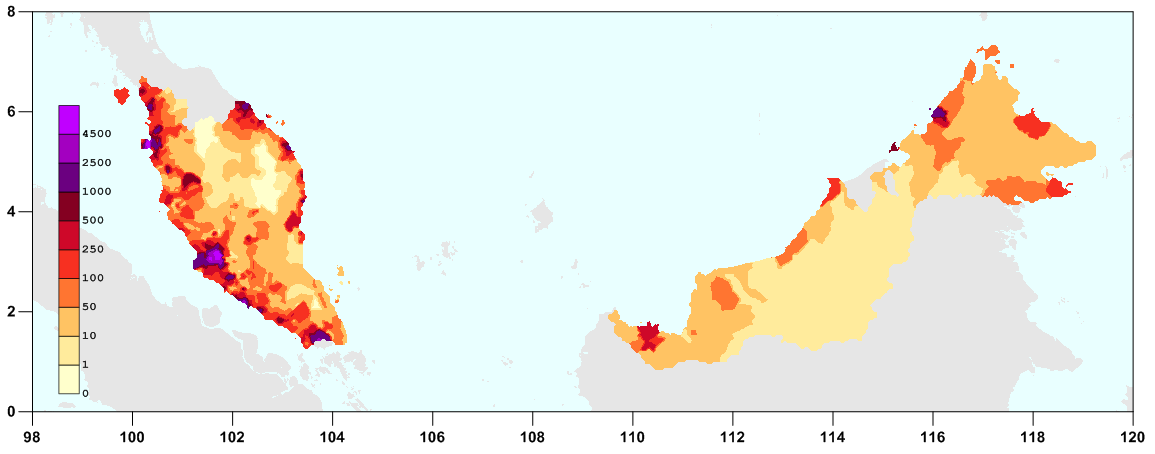
Population density (person per km^{2}) in 2010

The percentage distribution of Malaysian population by ethnic group based on 2010 census

According to the Malaysian Department of Statistics, the country's population was 32,447,385 in 2020, making it the 42nd-most populated country. According to a 2012 estimate, the population is increasing by 1.54% per year. Malaysia has an average population density of 96 people per km^{2}, ranking it 116th in the world for population density. People within the 15–64 age group constitute 70.3% of the total population; the 0–14 age group corresponds to 21.5%; while senior citizens aged 65 years or older make up 8.1%. In 1960, when the first official census was recorded in Malaysia, the population was 8.11 million. 90.1% of the population are Malaysian citizens.

Malaysian citizens are divided along local ethnic lines, with 70.6% considered bumiputera. The largest group of bumiputera are Malays, who are defined in the constitution as Muslims who practise Malay customs and culture. They play a dominant role politically. Bumiputera status is also accorded to the non-Malay indigenous groups of Sabah and Sarawak: which includes Dayaks (Iban, Bidayuh, Orang Ulu), Kadazan-Dusun, Melanau, Bajau and others. Non-Malay bumiputeras make up more than half of Sarawak's population and over two-thirds of Sabah's population. There are also indigenous or aboriginal groups in much smaller numbers on the peninsula, where they are collectively known as the Orang Asli. Laws over who receives bumiputera status vary between states.

There are also two other non-Bumiputera local ethnic groups. 22.1% of the population are Malaysian Chinese, while 6.5% are Malaysian Indian. The local Chinese have historically been more dominant in the business community. Local Indians are mostly of Tamil descent. Malaysian citizenship is not automatically granted to those born in Malaysia, but is granted to a child born of two Malaysian parents outside Malaysia. Dual citizenship is not permitted. Citizenship in the states of Sabah and Sarawak in Malaysian Borneo are distinct from citizenship in Peninsular Malaysia for immigration purposes. Every citizen is issued a biometric smart chip identity card known as MyKad at the age of 12 and must carry the card at all times.

The population is concentrated on Peninsular Malaysia, where about 80 percent of Malaysia's population live. 75.1% of the population is urban. Due to the rise in labour-intensive industries, the country is estimated to have over 3 million migrant workers; about 10% of the population. Sabah-based NGOs estimate that out of the 3 million that make up the population of Sabah, 2 million are illegal immigrants. Malaysia hosts a population of refugees and asylum seekers numbering approximately 171,500. Of this population, approximately 79,000 are from Myanmar, 72,400 from the Philippines, and 17,700 from Indonesia. Malaysian officials are reported to have turned deportees directly over to human smugglers in 2007, and Malaysia employs RELA, a volunteer militia with a history of controversies, to enforce its immigration law.

Largest cities and municipalities in Malaysia Department of Statistics, Malaysia (2020)
Rank	Name	State	Pop.	Rank	Name	State	Pop.
1	Kuala Lumpur	Federal Territory	1,982,112	11	Ipoh	Perak	759,952
2	Kajang	Selangor	1,047,356	12	Seremban	Negeri Sembilan	681,541
3	Seberang Perai	Penang	946,092	13	Iskandar Puteri	Johor	575,977
4	Subang Jaya	Selangor	902,086	14	Kuantan	Pahang	548,014
5	Klang	Selangor	902,025	15	Sungai Petani	Kedah	545,053
6	Johor Bahru	Johor	858,118	16	Ampang Jaya	Selangor	531,904
7	Shah Alam	Selangor	812,327	17	Kota Kinabalu	Sabah	500,425
8	George Town	Penang	794,313	18	Malacca City	Malacca	453,904
9	Petaling Jaya	Selangor	771,687	19	Sandakan	Sabah	439,050
10	Selayang	Selangor	764,327	20	Alor Setar	Kedah	423,868

=== Religion ===
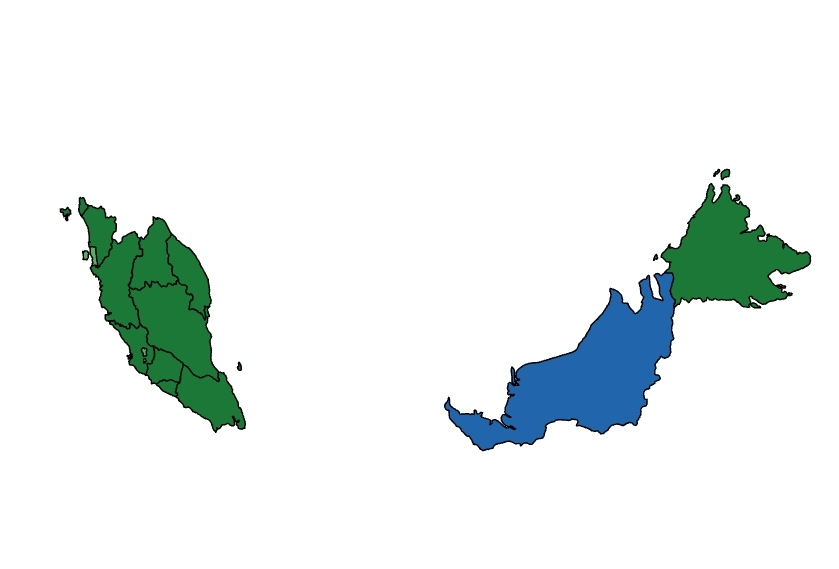
Dominant religious confessions in Malaysia according to 2020 census: Dark green: Muslim majority > 50% Light green: Muslim plurality < 50% Blue: Christian majority > 50%

The constitution grants freedom of religion, while establishing Islam as the "religion of the Federation". The freedom to change or leave a religion is limited for Muslims. According to the Population and Housing Census 2020 figures, ethnicity and religious beliefs correlate highly. Approximately 63.5% of the population practise Islam, 18.7% practise Buddhism, 9.1% Christianity, 6.1% Hinduism and 1.3% practise Confucianism, Taoism and other traditional Chinese religions. 2.7% declared no religion or practised other religions or did not provide any information. The states of Sarawak and Penang, as well as the federal territory of Kuala Lumpur have non-Muslim majorities.

Sunni Islam of the Shafi'i school of jurisprudence is the dominant branch of Islam in Malaysia, while 18% are nondenominational Muslims. The Malaysian constitution strictly defines what makes a "Malay", defining Malays as those who are Muslim, speak Malay regularly, practise Malay customs, and lived in or have ancestors from Brunei, Malaysia and Singapore. Statistics from the 2010 Census indicate that 83.6% of the Chinese population identify as Buddhist, with significant numbers of adherents following Taoism (3.4%) and Christianity (11.1%), along with small Muslim populations in areas like Penang. The majority of the Indian population follows Hinduism (86.2%), with a significant minority identifying as Christians (6.0%) or Muslims (4.1%). Christianity is the predominant religion of the non-Malay bumiputera community (46.5%), while 40.4% identify as Muslims.

Muslims are obliged to follow the decisions of Syariah Courts (i.e. Shariah courts) in matters concerning their religion. The Islamic judges are expected to follow the Shafi'i legal school of Islam, which is the main madhhab ('school of thought') of Malaysia. The jurisdiction of Syariah courts is limited to Muslims in matters such as marriage, inheritance, divorce, apostasy, religious conversion, custody, and limited Islamic criminal law. No other criminal or civil offences are under the jurisdiction of the Syariah courts, which have a similar hierarchy to the civil courts. The civil courts do not hear matters related to Islamic practices.

=== Languages ===
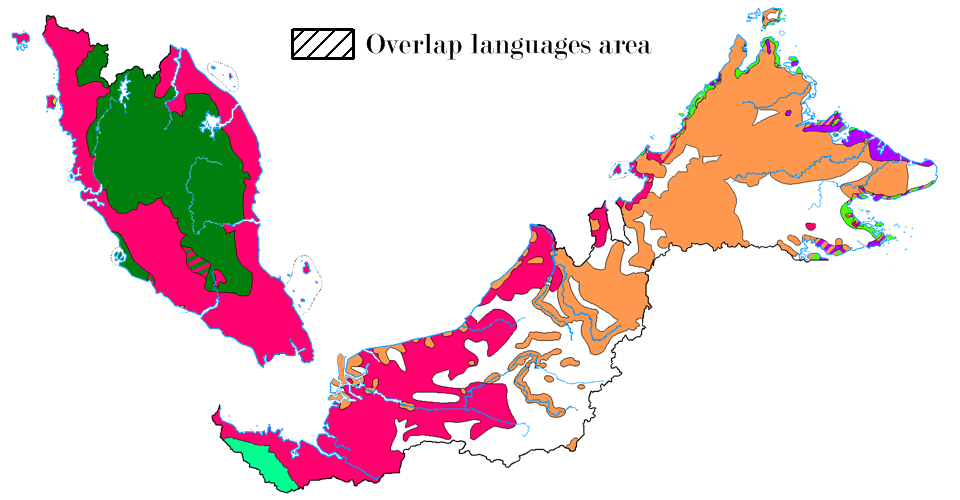
The distribution of language families of Malaysia shown by colours: Malayic Bornean Aslian Land Dayak Sama–Bajaw Philippine Chinese Areas with multiple languages

The official and national language of Malaysia is Malaysian Malay, a standardised form of the Malay language. The previous official terminology was Bahasa Malaysia (lit. 'Malaysian language') but now government policy uses Bahasa Melayu (Malay language) to refer to the official language and both terms remain in use. The National Language Act 1967 specifies the Latin (Rumi) script as the official script of the national language, but does not prohibit the use of the traditional Jawi script.

English remains an active second language, with its use allowed for some official purposes under the National Language Act of 1967. In Sarawak, English is an official state language alongside Malay. Historically, English was the de facto administrative language; Malay became predominant after the 1969 race riots (13 May incident). Malaysian English, also known as Malaysian Standard English, is a form of English derived from British English. Malaysian English is widely used in business, along with Manglish, which is a colloquial form of English with heavy Malay, Chinese, and Tamil influences. The government discourages the use of non-standard Malay but has no power to issue compounds or fines to those who use what is perceived as improper Malay on their advertisements.

Malaysia is also home to 111 living indigenous languages. Some Orang Asli languages are now extinct, such the Low Country Semang dialects once spoken in Penang. Many other languages are used in Malaysia, which contains speakers of 137 living languages. Peninsular Malaysia contains speakers of 41 of these languages. The native tribes of East Malaysia have their own languages which are related to, but easily distinguishable from, Malay. Iban is the main tribal language in Sarawak while Dusunic and Kadazan languages are spoken by the natives in Sabah. Chinese Malaysians predominantly speak Chinese dialects from the southern part of China. The more common Chinese varieties in the country are Mandarin, Cantonese, Hokkien, and so on. The Tamil language is used predominantly by the majority of Malaysian Indians. A small number of Malaysians have European ancestry and speak creole languages, such as the Portuguese-based Malaccan Creoles, and the Spanish-based Chavacano language.

=== Health ===
Malaysia operates an efficient and widespread two-tier healthcare system, consisting of a universal healthcare system and a co-existing private healthcare system; provided by highly subsidised healthcare through its extensive network of public hospitals and clinics. The Ministry of Health is the main provider of healthcare services to the country's population. Malaysia's healthcare system is considered to be among the most developed in Asia, which contributes to its thriving medical tourism industry.

Malaysia spent 3.83% of its GDP on healthcare in 2019. In 2020, the overall life expectancy in Malaysia at birth was 76 years (74 years for males and 78 years for females), and it had an infant mortality rate of 7 deaths per 1000 births. Malaysia had a total fertility rate of 2.0 in 2020, which is just below the replacement level of 2.1. In 2020, the country's crude birth rate was 16 per 1000 people, and the crude death rate was 5 per 1000 people.

In 2021, the principal cause of death among Malaysian adults was coronary artery disease, representing 17% of the medically certified deaths in 2020 – being followed by pneumonia; which accounted for 11% of the deaths. Transport accidents are considered a major health hazard, as Malaysia, relative to its population, has one of the highest traffic fatality rates in the world. Smoking is also considered a major health issue across the country.

=== Education ===
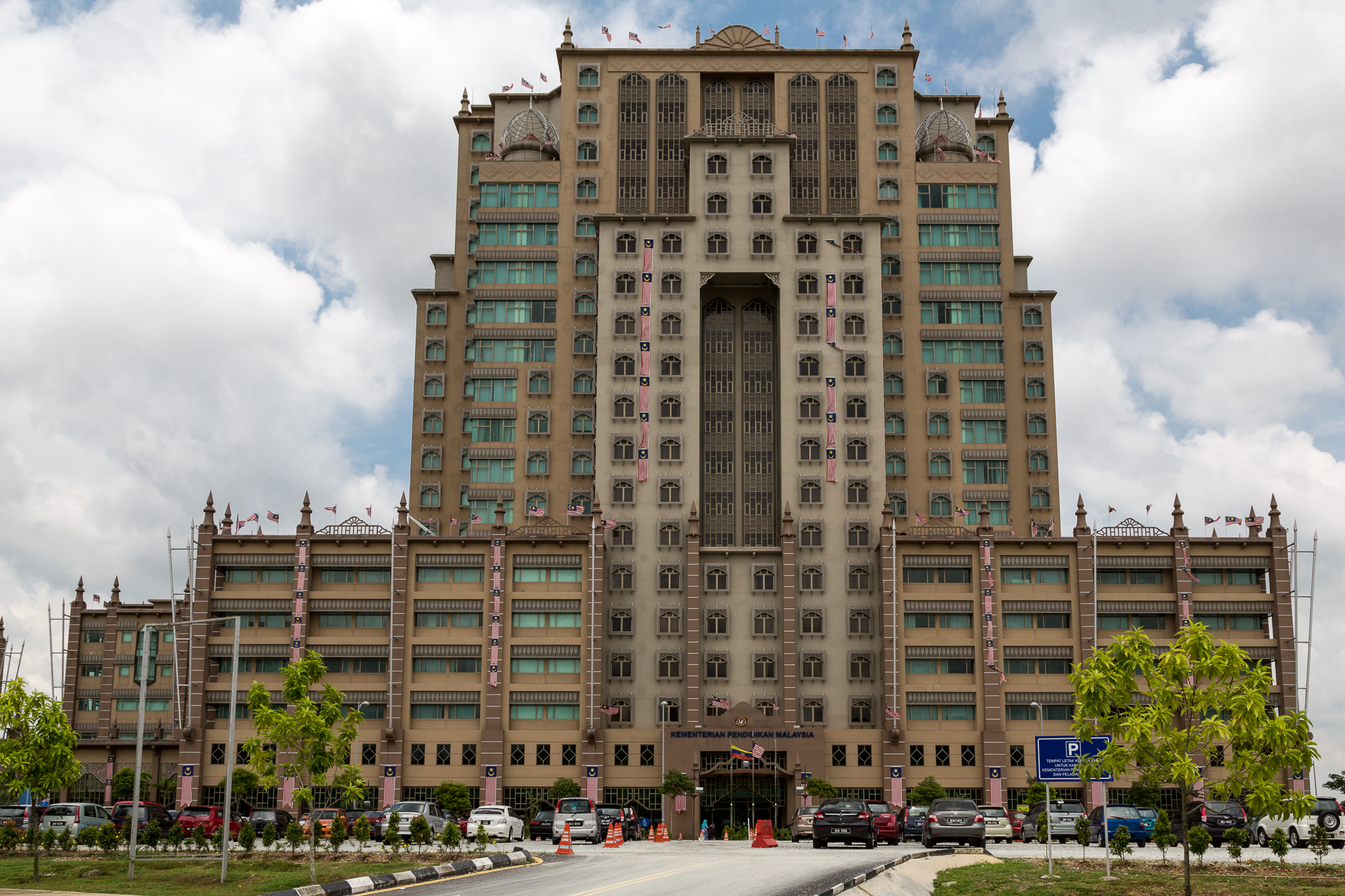
Ministry of Education, Putrajaya

The education system of Malaysia features a non-compulsory kindergarten education followed by six years of compulsory primary education and five years of optional secondary education. Schools in the primary education system are divided into two categories: national primary schools, which teach in Malay (i.e.:Sekolah Kebangsaan Sungai Binjai, SK Bukit Tiu), and vernacular schools, which teach in Chinese or Tamil (i.e.:SJK(C) Pin Hwa 2, SJK(T) Bandar Mentakab).

Secondary education (i.e.:SMK Sura, Kajang High School) is conducted for five years. In the final year of secondary education, students sit for the Malaysian Certificate of Education examination. Since the introduction of the matriculation programme in 1999, students who completed the 12-month programme in matriculation colleges can enrol in local universities. However, in the matriculation system, only 10% of places are open to non-bumiputera students.

== Culture ==
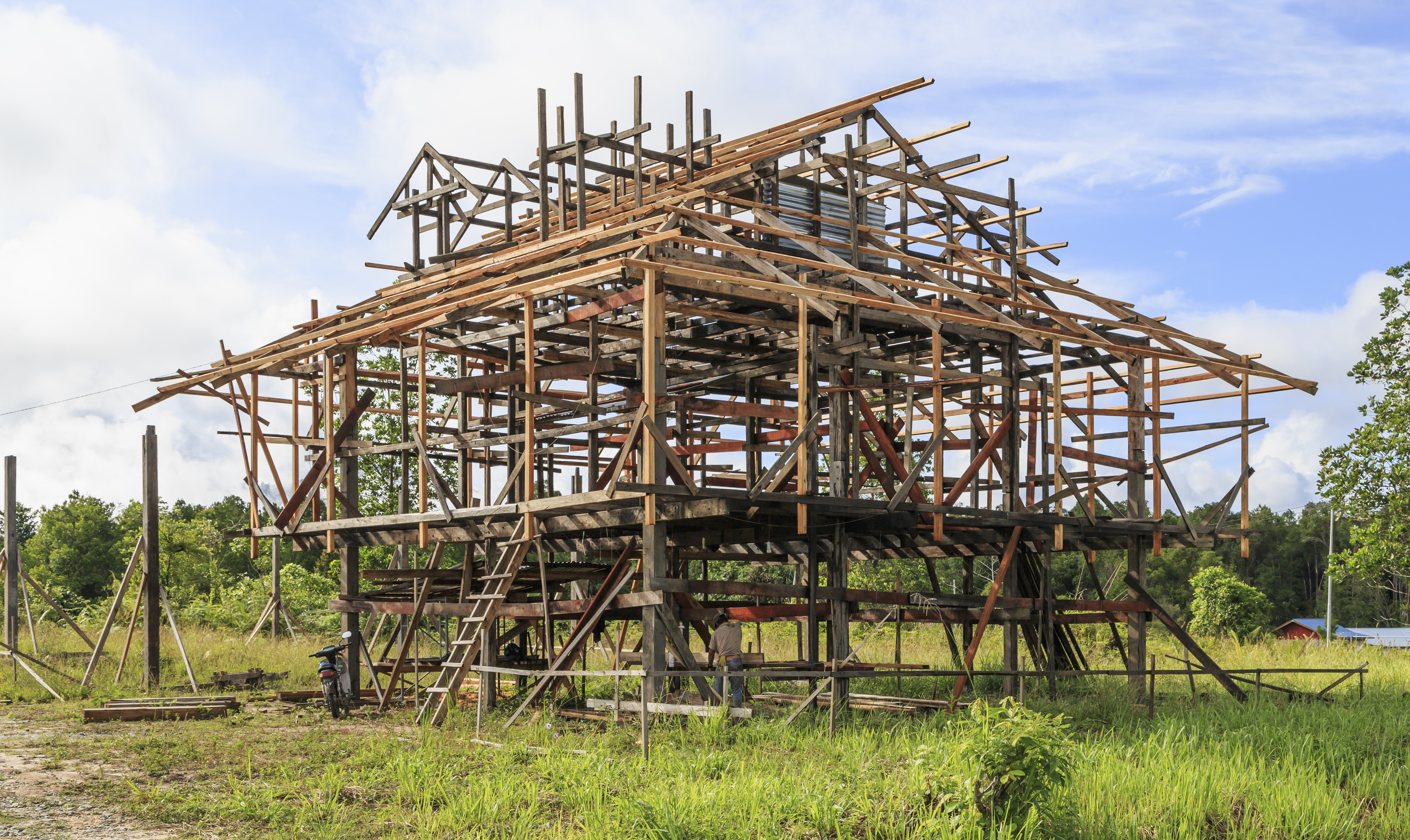
A traditional house being built in Sabah

Malaysia has a multi-ethnic, multicultural, and multilingual society. Substantial influence exists from Chinese and Indian cultures, dating back to when foreign trade began. Other cultural influences include the Persian, Arabic, and British cultures. Due to the structure of the government, coupled with the social contract theory, there has been minimal cultural assimilation of ethnic minorities. Some cultural disputes exist between Malaysia and neighbouring countries, notably Indonesia.

In 1971, the government created a "National Cultural Policy", defining Malaysian culture. It stated that Malaysian culture must be based on the culture of the indigenous peoples of Malaysia, that it may incorporate suitable elements from other cultures, and that Islam must play a part in it. It also promoted the Malay language above others. This government intervention into culture has caused resentment among non-Malays who feel their cultural freedom was lessened. Both Chinese and Indian associations have submitted memorandums to the government, accusing it of formulating an undemocratic culture policy.

=== Fine arts ===
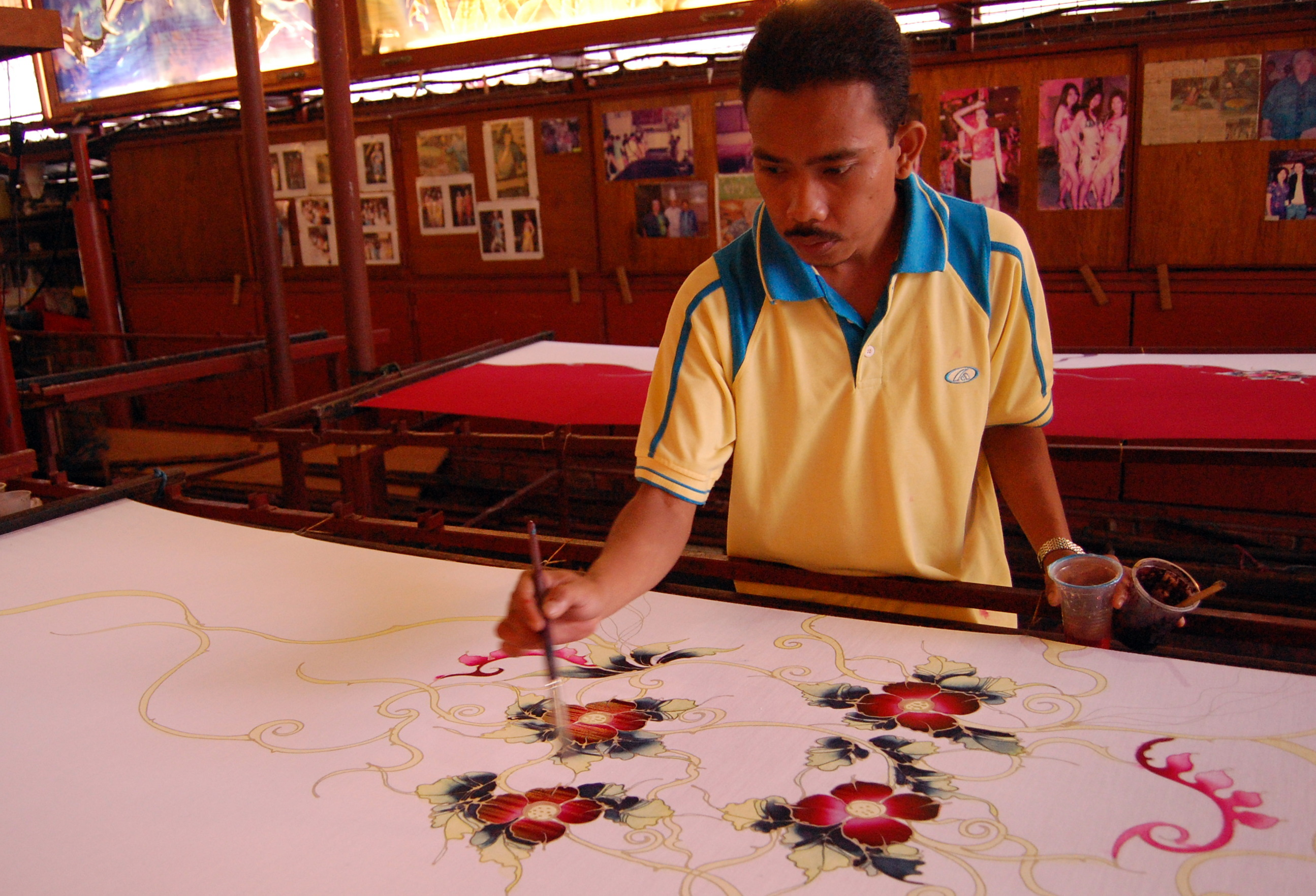
A craftsman making batik. Malaysian batik is usually patterned with floral motifs with light colouring.

Traditional Malaysian art was mainly centred on the areas of carving, weaving, and silversmithing. Traditional art ranges from handwoven baskets from rural areas to the silverwork of the Malay courts. Common artworks included ornamental kris, beetle nut sets, and woven batik and songket fabrics. Indigenous East Malaysians are known for their wooden masks. Each ethnic group have distinct performing arts, with little overlap between them. However, Malay art does show some North Indian influence due to the historical influence of India.

Traditional Malay music and performing arts appear to have originated in the Kelantan-Pattani region with influences from India, China, Thailand, and Indonesia. The music is based around percussion instruments, the most important of which is the gendang (drum). There are at least 14 types of traditional drums. Drums and other traditional percussion instruments and are often made from natural materials. Music is traditionally used for storytelling, celebrating life-cycle events, and occasions such as a harvest. It was once used as a form of long-distance communication. In East Malaysia, gong-based musical ensembles such as agung and kulintang are commonly used in ceremonies such as funerals and weddings. These ensembles are also common in neighbouring regions such as in Mindanao in the Philippines, Kalimantan in Indonesia, and Brunei.

Malaysia has a strong oral tradition that has existed since before the arrival of writing and continues today. Each of the Malay Sultanates created their own literary tradition, influenced by pre-existing oral stories and by the stories that came with Islam. The first Malay literature was in the Arabic script. The earliest known Malay writing is on the Terengganu Stone, made in 1303. Chinese and Indian literature became common as the number of speakers increased in Malaysia, and locally produced works based on languages from those areas began to be produced in the 19th century. English has also become a common literary language. In 1971, the government took the step of defining the literature of different languages. Literature written in Malay was called "the national literature of Malaysia", literature in other bumiputera languages was called "regional literature", while literature in other languages was called "sectional literature". Malay poetry is highly developed, and uses many forms. The Hikayat form is popular, and the pantun has spread from Malay to other languages.

=== Cuisine ===
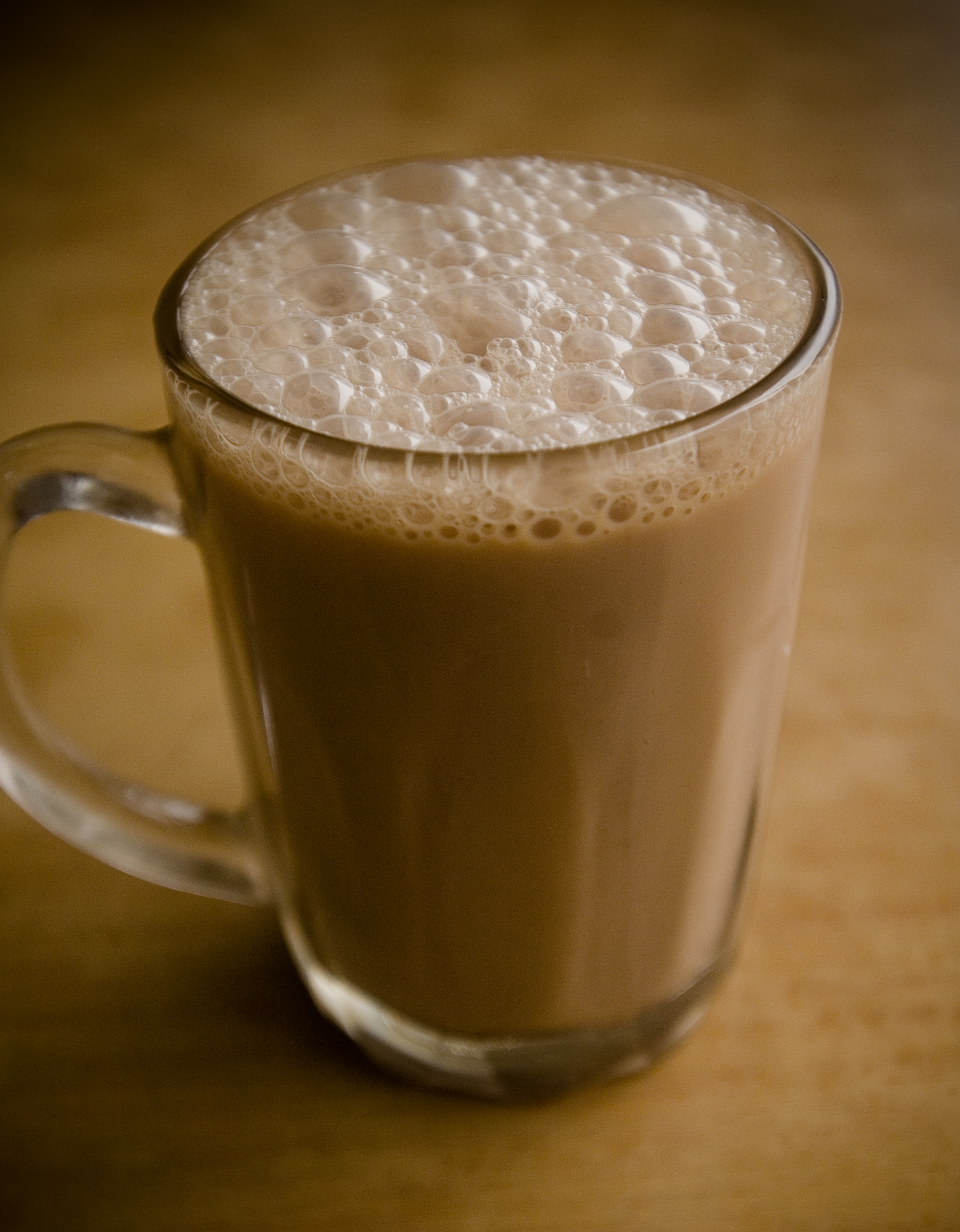
Teh tarik

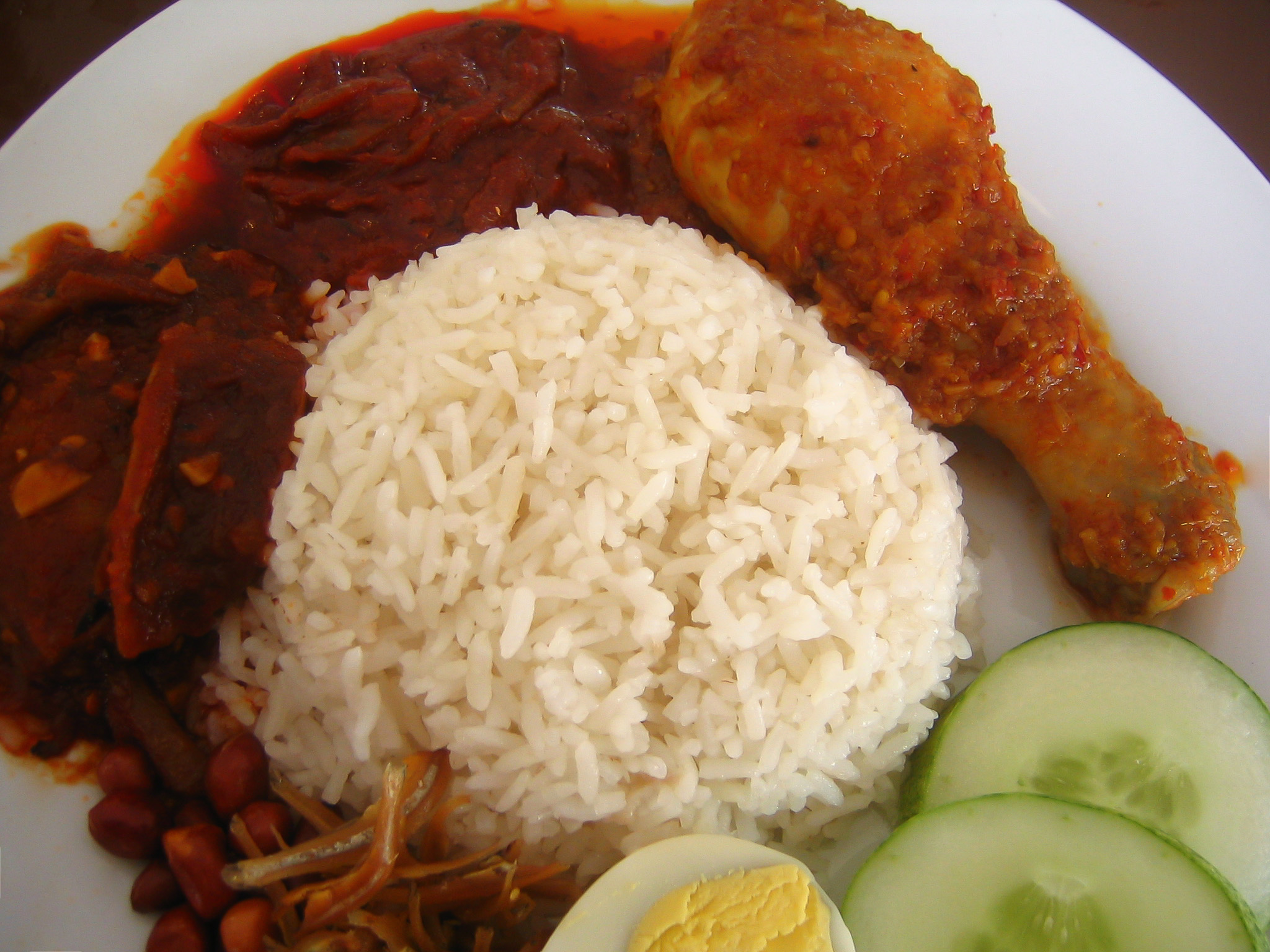
Nasi lemak

The national drink and dish of Malaysia

Malaysia's cuisine reflects the multi-ethnic makeup of its population. Many cultures from within the country and from surrounding regions have greatly influenced the cuisine. Much of the influence comes from the Malay, Chinese, Indian, Thai, Javanese, and Sumatran cultures, largely due to the country being part of the ancient spice route. The cuisine is similar to those of Singapore and Brunei, and also bears resemblance to Filipino cuisine. The different states have varied dishes, and often the food in Malaysia is different from the original dishes.

Sometimes food not found in its original culture is assimilated into another; for example, Chinese restaurants in Malaysia often serve Malay dishes. Food from one culture is sometimes also cooked using styles taken from another culture, For example, sambal belacan (shrimp paste) are commonly used as ingredients by Chinese restaurants to create the stir fried water spinach (kangkung belacan). This means that although much of Malaysian food can be traced back to a certain culture, they have their own identity. Rice is a staple food and an important constituent of the country's culture. Chili is commonly found in local cuisine, although this does not necessarily make them spicy.

=== Media ===
Logo of Radio Televisyen Malaysia, the country's main public broadcaster

Malaysia's main newspapers are owned by the government and political parties in the ruling coalition, although some major opposition parties also have their own, which are openly sold alongside regular newspapers. A divide exists between the media in the two halves of the country. Peninsular-based media gives a low priority to news from the East and often treats the eastern states as colonies of the peninsula. As a result of this, Sarawak launched TV Sarawak as an internet streaming beginning in 2014, and later as a TV station on 10 October 2020 to overcome the low priority and coverage of Peninsular-based media and to solidify the representation of East Malaysia. The media have been blamed for increasing tension between Indonesia and Malaysia, and giving Malaysians a bad image of Indonesians. The country has Malay, English, Chinese, and Tamil daily newspapers. Kadazandusun and Bajau news are available only via TV broadcast Berita RTM. Written Kadazan news was once included in publications such as The Borneo Post, the Borneo Mail, the Daily Express, and the New Sabah Times, but publication has ceased with the newspaper or as a section.

Freedom of the press is limited, with numerous restrictions on publishing rights and information dissemination. The government has previously tried to crack down on opposition papers before elections. In 2007, a government agency issued a directive to all private television and radio stations to refrain from broadcasting speeches made by opposition leaders, a move condemned by politicians from the opposition Democratic Action Party. Sabah, where all tabloids but one are independent of government control, has the freest press in Malaysia. Laws such as the Printing Presses and Publications Act have also been cited as curtailing freedom of expression.

=== Holidays and festivals ===
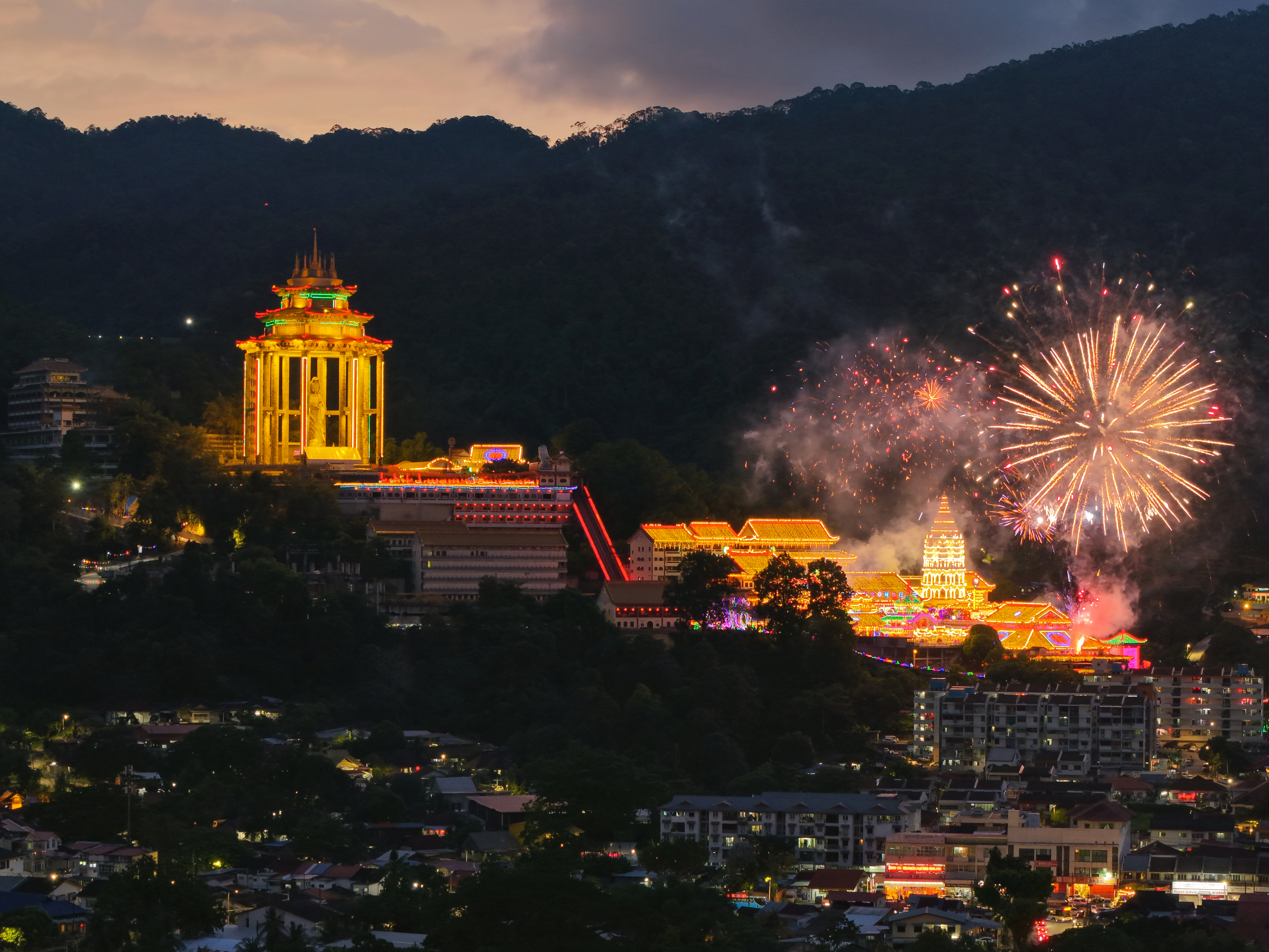
Malaysia's largest Buddhist temple—Kek Lok Si in Penang—illuminated in preparation for Chinese New Year

Malaysians observe several holidays and festivities throughout the year. Some are federally gazetted public holidays and some are observed by individual states. Other festivals are observed by particular ethnic or religious groups, and the main holiday of each major group has been declared a public holiday. Malaysia has two official national holidays: Hari Merdeka (Independence Day) on 31 August, commemorating the independence of the Federation of Malaya in 1957--is the most widely observed holiday--and the more recent Malaysia Day on 16 September (since 2010) which commemorates the Malaysia Federation in 1963 with the states of Sabah and Sarawak both in East Malaysia. Other notable national holidays are Labour Day (1 May) and the King's birthday (first week of June).

Muslim holidays are prominent as Islam is the state religion; Hari Raya Puasa (also called Hari Raya Aidilfitri, Malay for Eid al-Fitr), Hari Raya Haji (also called Hari Raya Aidiladha, Malay for Eid al-Adha), Maulidur Rasul (birthday of the Prophet), and others being observed. Malaysian Chinese celebrate festivals such as Chinese New Year and others relating to traditional Chinese beliefs. Wesak Day is observed and celebrated by Buddhists. Hindus in Malaysia celebrate Deepavali, the festival of lights, while Thaipusam is a religious rite which sees pilgrims from all over the country converge at the Batu Caves. Malaysia's Christian community celebrates most of the holidays observed by Christians elsewhere, most notably Christmas and Easter. In addition to this, the Dayak community in Sarawak celebrate a harvest festival known as Gawai, and the Kadazandusun community celebrate Kaamatan. Despite most festivals being identified with a particular ethnic or religious group, celebrations are universal. In a custom known as "open house" Malaysians participate in the celebrations of others, often visiting the houses of those who identify with the festival.

=== Sports ===
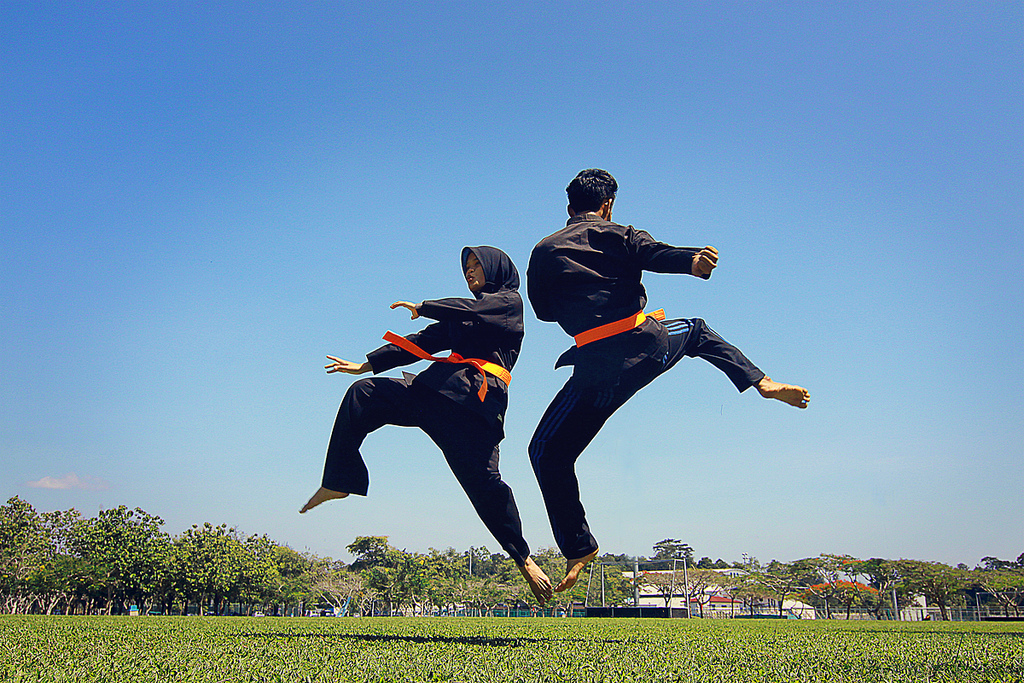
Traditional sports, such as the martial art style Silat Melayu, persist alongside modern sports.

Popular sports in Malaysia include association football, badminton, field hockey, bowls, tennis, squash, martial arts, horse riding, sailing, and skate boarding. Football is the most popular sport in Malaysia. Badminton matches also attract thousands of spectators, and since 1948 Malaysia has been one of four countries to hold the Thomas Cup, the world team championship trophy of men's badminton. The Malaysian Lawn Bowls Federation was registered in 1997. Squash was brought to the country by members of the British army, with the first competition being held in 1939. The Squash Racquets Association of Malaysia was created on 25 June 1972. The men's national field hockey team ranked 10th in the world as of June 2022. The 3rd Hockey World Cup was hosted at Merdeka Stadium in Kuala Lumpur, as well as the 10th cup. The country also has its own Formula One track—the Sepang International Circuit, with the first Malaysian Grand Prix held in 1999. Traditional sports include Silat Melayu, the most common style of martial arts practised by ethnic Malays.

The Federation of Malaya Olympic Council was formed in 1953 and received recognition by the IOC in 1954. It first participated in the 1956 Melbourne Olympic Games. The council was renamed the Olympic Council of Malaysia in 1964, and has participated in all but one Olympic games since its inception. The largest number of athletes ever sent to the Olympics was 57 to the 1972 Munich Olympic Games. Besides the Olympic Games, Malaysia also participates in the Paralympic Games. Malaysia has competed at the Commonwealth Games since 1950 as Malaya, and since 1966 as Malaysia, and the games were hosted in Kuala Lumpur in 1998.

== See also ==
- Outline of Malaysia
