= Malay Kingdom =

Malay Kingdom may refer to:

- Melayu Kingdom, the 7th to 14th century classical Buddhist kingdom based on the island of Sumatra
- Kingdoms or polities, both historical and present, established in Malay world or Malay Archipelago. Most prominent among others are Malacca Sultanate, Johor-Riau-Lingga Sultanate, and Brunei Sultanate
- Malaysia, a nation formed as a federation of several Malay kingdoms and states
