= Proposed 2019 amendment to the Constitution of Malaysia =

Bill regarding the status of Sabah and Sarawak in Malaysia

Constitution (Amendment) Bill 2019

Parliament of Malaysia
- Long title: A Bill intituled an Act to amend the Federal Constitution.
- Citation: D.R 7/2019
- Territorial extent: Malaysia
- Considered by: Dewan Rakyat

Legislative history
- Bill title: Constitution (Amendment) Bill 2019
- Bill citation: D.R 7/2019
- Introduced by: Liew Vui Keong
- First reading: 4 April 2019
- Second reading: 9 April 2019 (negatived)

Amends
- Constitution of Malaysia

Related legislation
- Constitution (Amendment) Act 1976

Summary
- To restore the constitutional status of Sabah and Sarawak according to the Malaysia Agreement.
- Status: Not passed

On 4 April 2019, a bill proposing an amendment to the Constitution of Malaysia was tabled in the Dewan Rakyat of the Parliament of Malaysia. The bill proposes to amend Article 1(2) so as to restore the status of the two East Malaysian states of Sabah and Sarawak according to the original content of Malaysia Agreement that was signed in 1963.

Despite six hours of debate in the Parliament during the second reading of the bill on 9 April, only 138 MPs supported the bill, 10 votes short of the two-thirds majority of the chamber, 148 votes, required for amendments to the Constitution. The remaining 59 (non-absent) votes were abstentions, all of which are from opposition parties.

== Background ==
=== 1976 constitutional amendment ===
In 1976, under the Malaysian government, Article 1(2) was amended as part of a larger package affecting 45 articles and 2 schedules in the Constitution of Malaysia. This package removed the distinction between the states in Peninsular Malaysia and the Bornean states of Sabah and Sarawak. It was argued, at the time, that the change would lead to greater uniformity between the eastern and western regions of Malaysia. As a result of some political maneuvering by the government, no MPs from Sabah or Sarawak opposed this amendment package.

=== Breaches of the Malaysia Agreement ===
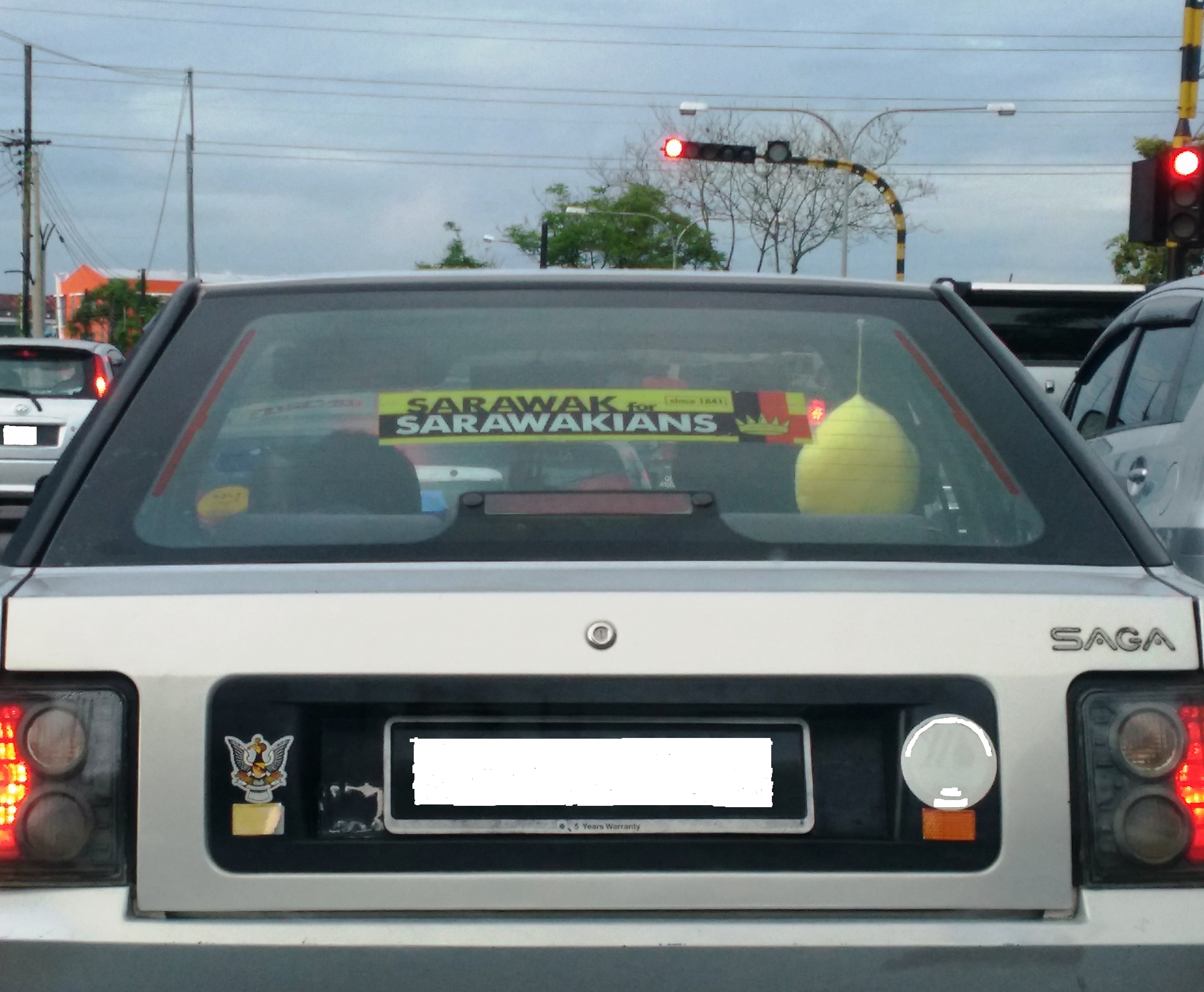
A "Sarawak for Sarawakians" car sticker incorporating elements of a pre-Malaysian Sarawak flag.

The 1963 Malaysia Agreement, under which Sabah and Sarawak unified with Malaya to become Malaysia, included strong provisions for the autonomy of Sabah and Sarawak (see the 18-point and 20-point agreement). However, this autonomy has eroded in numerous aspects, such as a smaller share of oil revenue than previously agreed and a purported reduction in the territorial waters that belonged to each state. Following their victory in the 2018 election, the Pakatan Harapan alliance promised to make changes including an amendment to Article 1(2) and a greater share of oil revenue. Other causes of dispute between East and West Malaysia include freedom of religion, distribution of profits from natural resources, and demographic change (particularly in Sabah).

Prior to 2010, the anniversary of Federation was a public holiday in only the East Malaysian states, but it was later made a national holiday by the government in response to an opposition statement declaring their intention to do so if they won an election. Some groups, including the Borneo Heritage Foundation (BHF), Movement for Change Sarawak (MoCS), and the Sarawak Association of People's Aspirations (SAPA), have cited these issues, among others, as reasons for advocating separation from Malaysia.

1963 Malaysia Agreement (MA63)
Authority of Sabah Sarawak	MA63 as agreed between United Kingdom, Malaya, North Borneo, Sarawak, Singapore	Current situation under Malaysia
Development	British delegation promised both states a total of £1½ million a year for five years after Malaysia Day, provided the Malayan government also extended aid for that period. Malaya would provide $200 million to North Borneo and $300 million to Sarawak for the first five years of Malaysia, while Singapore would provide a $150 million development loan to North Borneo and Sarawak, of which $100 million would be interest-free for five years	Sabah: RM5 billion per year Sarawak: RM4.3 billion per year
Education	Rights to own education system (Note: Education, while becoming a federal subject in principle, is to remain practically under state control until the state government otherwise decides; in particular, the present policy of teaching in English is to continue.)	Malaysia standardised education system (Dilapidated schools and frequent misinformation in history textbooks for both Sabah and Sarawak history)
Immigration	Control immigration entry (Note: Immigration to remain largely under state control; while the federation is to have general control of movement in and out of Malaysia and between states, entry into the Borneo states will require the approval of the state concerned, and except that the federal government may bar entry in the national interest, the Borneo states are to have discretion in permitting entry by persons outside Malaysia. On citizenship, through the Cobbold Commission recommendations provides additional provisions for the registration of foreign-born residents in the eight years after Malaysia.)	Controlled immigration entry via permit (Sabah: Southern Filipino refugees fleeing the civil war were issued IMM13 documents by the Federal government, instead of the Sabahan state government, leading to a situation whereby the refugees, and their families who had settled in Sabah, could not be stripped of their IMM13 without rendering them stateless as the Philippine government did not recognise them as citizens)
Language	English as the official language (Note: The national language of the federation will be Malay, but English is to remain an official language for ten years after Malaysia Day and thereafter till the state legislature otherwise provides.)	Sabah: Malay is amended as official language through the controversial 1973 State Constitution; Sarawak: Both Malay and English are official language as of 2015 (Malay is also used in all courts except High Court and Native Court)
Law	Authority to agree/disagree to amend law (Note: On the special position of the indigenous race, it adopts the recommendations of the Malayan members of the commission and provides that in the federal public service as well as within the states, the Borneo indigenous are to enjoy the special rights and privileges that Malay now enjoy under the present constitution. In matters concerning land administration the powers of the federation vis-à-vis the states are to be modified to give the states the power to decide whether or not to follow the policies formulated in the National Land Council. The Borneo states are to have a total of 40 seats in the Federal House of Representatives – 24 to Sarawak and 16 to North Borneo. No reduction in the proportion of their representation to the whole (except by reason of the entry of new states) may take place in the seven years after Malaysia without the concurrence of the government of the state concerned, and thereafter any change in proportion must be supported by a two-thirds majority in each House of Parliament.)	Recognised as state under Malaysian laws with the exclusion of certain laws (e.g. National Land Code) (Frequent reported conflicts with federal government regarding indigenous land rights)
Natural resources	North Borneo: 40% of the state revenue Sarawak: Up to RM21 million for the first four years (Both North Borneo and Sarawak retain import duty, excise duty and export duty with North Borneo retain a total of 30% from customs and excise for as long it is responsible for health and medical expenditure) (Note: On finance, it is agreed that the level of federal taxation in the states should be brought up to federal levels over a period of years, and that in addition to the sources of revenue at present allocated to states, North Borneo and Sarawak should retain import duty and excise duty on petroleum products, export duty on timber and other forest produce, and export duty on minerals up to a joint total of royalty and export duty of 10 per cent ad valorem; and that in the case of North Borneo the state should retain a total of 30 per cent of revenue from customs and excise for as long as it is responsible for health and medical expenditure. In addition to the capitation and road grants received by states under the existing constitution, North Borneo and Sarawak are to receive balancing grant equal to the difference between assigned state revenue in 1963 (including statutory grants) and the estimated cost of services; Sarawak is to receive an escalating annual grant in order to assure adequate expansion of state services, and a special grant is also to be assigned to North Borneo, proportionate to the increase in federal revenue from that state in 1963. (These grants are to be subject to review in the first ten years after Malaysia).)	In 1966, the Continental Shelf Act was enforced by the federal government on the two despite both had already extended their jurisdiction over the continental shelf adjacent to their territory. Further in 1974, the Petroleum Development Act was enforced on the two, giving them only 5% of oil royalty from the revenue
Religion	No official religion (Note: Islam remains the religion of the federation, but is not to be established as the state religion in either territory, and the Borneo States are not to be required to contribute to financial aid for Muslim institutions or education, either in the states or in the federation.)	Sabah: Islam is amended as official religion through the controversial 1973 State Constitution; Sarawak: No official religion (Updated in state government website as of 2015. In 2018, Sarawak began to allow converts to renounce Islam if they already wish so without the need to keep forcing them to stay in the religion) (Frequent cases of Sabahan and Sarawakians non-Muslims identified as Muslims, Muslims who wish to convert out of Islam are being prevented as well the rampant religious intolerance and conversion of non-Muslims students in schools without their parents consent. In July 2006, state mufti of Sabah issued a fatwa to an ongoing Taoist statue project where a stop-work order was then being imposed by the state government on the construction of Mazu (Goddess of the Sea) statue in Kudat District. Further in April 2007, a local businesswoman loan application was rejected because her unisex styling business was in conflict with Islam)
See also: 1962 Inter-Governmental Committee (IGC) Report and 1963 Malaysia Agreement

=== Inter-governmental negotiations ===
In October 2009, the then Prime Minister Najib Razak declared that Malaysia Day would become a national holiday with the intent of promoting unity between West and East Malaysia. On the Malaysia Day following his victory in the 2018 general election, Prime Minister Mahathir Mohamad announced a commitment to restore Sabah and Sarawak as equal partners to Western Peninsula after a review of the 1963 Malaysia Agreement. That year, the Prime Minister's Department published a special article regarding the formation of the country.

On 5 March 2019, a meeting was held between Prime Minister Mahathir and representatives from the Sabah and Sarawak governments. Neither party identified any significant items of dispute with regards to the 1963 agreement. Items that were not resolved, such as stamp duty were to be referred to a Technical Review for detailed assessment. Although some issues were unresolved, Minister of Law in the Prime Minister's Department Liew Vui Keong announced on 8 March that the cabinet had agreed to amend Article 1(2) of the Federal Constitution and that the amendment will be tabled for the next sitting of Parliament on 11 March. On 11 March, the sitting of Parliament began with the amendment being the primary focus of discussion.

On 2 April, Minister Liew announced that the federal government would table the amendment at the Parliamentary meeting, scheduled for the following week.

== Dewan Rakyat debate ==
=== First reading ===
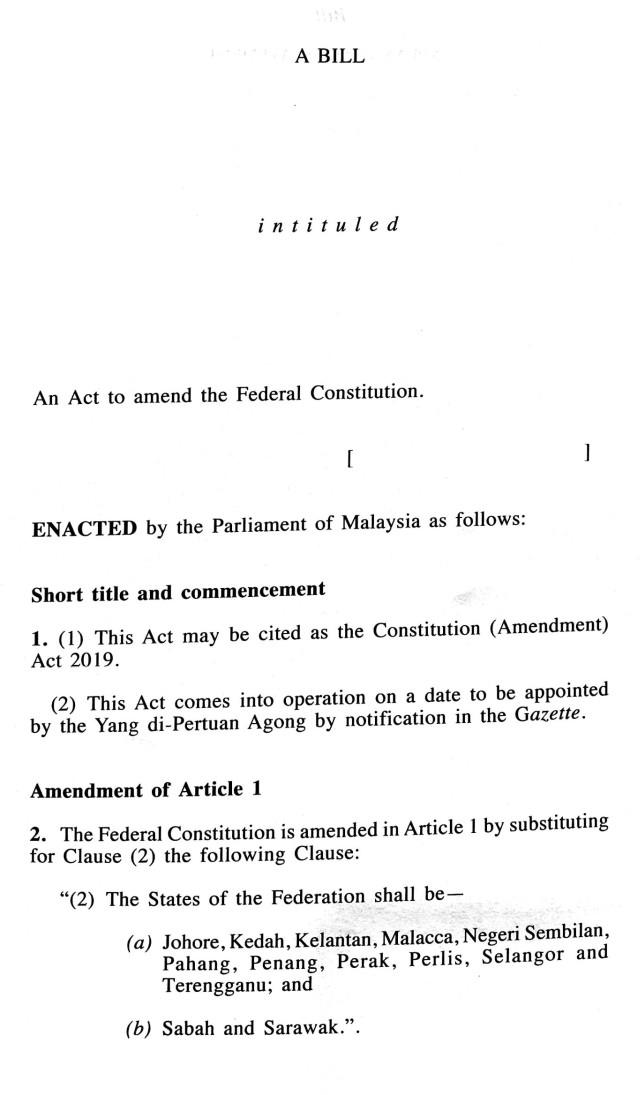
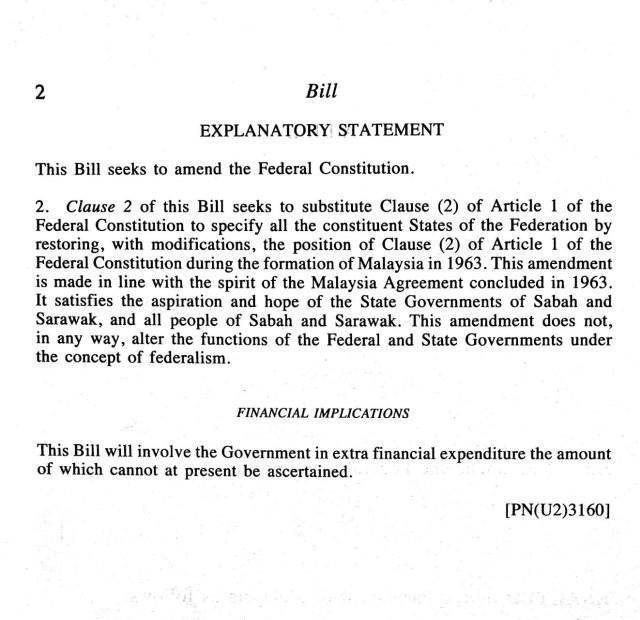
(Left) A copy of the bill on the proposed amendment as retrieved on 4 April 2019. Article 1 (2) as it stands now, reads: "The States of the Federation shall be Johore, Kedah, Kelantan, Malacca, Negeri Sembilan, Pahang, Penang, Perak, Perlis, Sabah, Sarawak, Selangor and Terengganu".
(Right) The bill explanatory statement.

On 4 April, before the amendment could be tabled for its first reading by Minister Liew, a number of opposition MPs from Sabah and Sarawak raised significant concerns that the proposed amendment was being pushed through without adequate consultation with East Malaysian MPs on the draft contents. Minister Liew responded with a statement in Parliament that the amendment would effectively change the status of Sabah and Sarawak from state into territory, once the committee completed their review of the 1963 agreement.

In his statement, Liew also explained that the special committee was chaired by Prime Minister Mahathir, along with the Chief Ministers of Sabah and Sarawak, the Attorney Generals and other high-ranking officers. However, he did not clarify why the bill should be passed before other separate amendments, which would promote greater autonomy of the two entities, were implemented. Despite the review and meetings, the bill was opposed after the reading, with one opposition MP, Sim Kui Hian of the Sarawak United Peoples' Party (SUPP) who voted against the bill, stating in an interview that the amendment retained Sarawak as one of the 13 states of Malaysia rather than equal partner. He also stated that there was no amendment to Article 160 of the constitution regarding the definition of "Federation", which should be based on the Malaysia Agreement of 1963 instead of the Malaya Agreement of 1957. Other opposition MPs also followed suit demanding the bill be temporary retracted.

=== Second reading ===
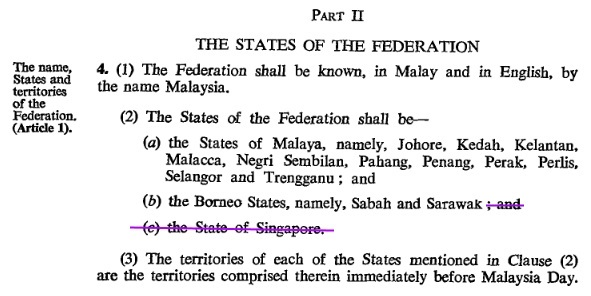
The bill redefinition as announced by Minister in the Prime Minister's Department for Legal Affairs, Liew Vui Keong on 8 April 2019 for the amendment as according to the original 1963 agreement with the exclusion of Singapore, which have left the federation in 1965.

On 8 April, Minister Liew stated that the wording of the bill would follow the 1963 version of Article 1(2) of the Constitution. The minister also stated that he received no opposition from the Prime Minister or the federal Attorney General. However, despite these changes, Fadillah Yusof, Chief Whip of the Sarawak Parties Coalition (GPS), stood firm on a request that the bill be temporarily withdrawn, or referred to a select committee, for further discussion.

In a speech on 9 April, during the second reading of the bill, Prime Minister Mahathir stated that the amendment was a "starting point and [this] is an appropriate time for the Pakatan Harapan (PH) government to take the first step in realising the needs of the people in Sabah and Sarawak in line with the Malaysia Agreement 1963". People's Justice Party (PKR) President Anwar Ibrahim concurred saying the matter had undergone extensive debate and that the concerns of the people of Sabah and Sarawak were being addressed by the PH administration. He also stated that restoration of the two states was a meaningful step being undertaken by the PH government, compared to the half century of inaction by the previous Barisan Nasional government, and should not be opposed.

In response to a question from Ketereh MP Tan Sri Annuar Musa concerning the necessity of having a select committee review the bill, Sabah Chief Minister Shafie Apdal agreed that such a review was unnecessary and would only delay other amendments that would restore other aspects of the 1963 agreement. He also refuted claims that passing of the bill would result in an "erosion of nationhood among the people of Sabah and Sarawak".

==== Division result ====
At 10:20 pm local time, the chamber divided. Of the 197 MPs present, 138 voted in support for the amendment while 59, primarily members of the Barisan Nasional coalition, did not cast a vote. The bill was put up for voting by Speaker Mohamad Ariff Md Yusof after a day-long debate with no MPs from either side actually opposing the restoration bill.

Votes by each MP mapped onto their respective constituencies.

Constitution (Amendment) Bill 2019: second reading division result
No.	Name	Party (coalition)	Constituency	State
Supported (138)
1	Abdul Latiff Ahmad	Malaysian United Indigenous Party (Pakatan Harapan)	Mersing	Johor
2	Abdul Rahim Bakri	Malaysian United Indigenous Party (Pakatan Harapan)	Kudat	Sabah
3	Abdullah Sani Abdul Hamid	People's Justice Party (Pakatan Harapan)	Kapar	Selangor
4	Ahmad Faizal Azumu	Malaysian United Indigenous Party (Pakatan Harapan)	Tambun	Perak
5	Ahmad Hassan	Sabah Heritage Party	Papar	Sabah
6	Akmal Nasrullah Nasir	People's Justice Party (Pakatan Harapan)	Johor Bahru	Johor
7	Ali Biju	People's Justice Party (Pakatan Harapan)	Saratok	Sarawak
8	Alice Lau Kiong Yieng	Democratic Action Party (Pakatan Harapan)	Lanang	Sarawak
9	Amiruddin Hamzah	Malaysian United Indigenous Party (Pakatan Harapan)	Kubang Pasu	Kedah
10	Anifah Aman	Independent	Kimanis	Sabah
11	Anthony Loke Siew Fook	Democratic Action Party (Pakatan Harapan)	Seremban	Negeri Sembilan
12	Anuar Tahir	National Trust Party (Pakatan Harapan)	Temerloh	Pahang
13	Anwar Ibrahim	People's Justice Party (Pakatan Harapan)	Port Dickson	Negeri Sembilan
14	Arthur Joseph Kurup	United Sabah People's Party (Gabungan Bersatu Sabah)	Pensiangan	Sabah
15	Awang Husaini Sahari	People's Justice Party (Pakatan Harapan)	Putatan	Sabah
16	Azis Jamman	Sabah Heritage Party	Sepanggar	Sabah
17	Azizah Dun	Malaysian United Indigenous Party (Pakatan Harapan)	Beaufort	Sabah
18	Azman Ismail	People's Justice Party (Pakatan Harapan)	Kuala Kedah	Kedah
19	Baru Bian	People's Justice Party (Pakatan Harapan)	Selangau	Sarawak
20	Cha Kee Chin	Democratic Action Party (Pakatan Harapan)	Rasah	Negeri Sembilan
21	Chan Foong Hin	Democratic Action Party (Pakatan Harapan)	Kota Kinabalu	Sabah
22	Chan Ming Kai	People's Justice Party (Pakatan Harapan)	Alor Setar	Kedah
23	Chang Lih Kang	People's Justice Party (Pakatan Harapan)	Tanjong Malim	Perak
24	Charles Santiago	Democratic Action Party (Pakatan Harapan)	Klang	Selangor
25	Chong Chieng Jen	Democratic Action Party (Pakatan Harapan)	Stampin	Sarawak
26	Chow Kon Yeow	Democratic Action Party (Pakatan Harapan)	Tanjong	Penang
27	Christina Liew Chin Jin	People's Justice Party (Pakatan Harapan)	Tawau	Sabah
28	Darell Leiking	Sabah Heritage Party	Penampang	Sabah
29	Dzulkefly Ahmad	National Trust Party (Pakatan Harapan)	Kuala Selangor	Selangor
30	Eddin Syazlee Shith	Malaysian United Indigenous Party (Pakatan Harapan)	Kuala Pilah	Negeri Sembilan
31	Edmund Santhara	People's Justice Party (Pakatan Harapan)	Segamat	Johor
32	Fahmi Fadzil	People's Justice Party (Pakatan Harapan)	Lembah Pantai	Kuala Lumpur
33	Farid Rafik	Malaysian United Indigenous Party (Pakatan Harapan)	Tanjung Piai	Johor
34	Fasiah Fakeh	Malaysian United Indigenous Party (Pakatan Harapan)	Sabak Bernam	Selangor
35	Fong Kui Lun	Democratic Action Party (Pakatan Harapan)	Bukit Bintang	Kuala Lumpur
36	Fuziah Salleh	People's Justice Party (Pakatan Harapan)	Kuantan	Pahang
37	Gobind Singh Deo	Democratic Action Party (Pakatan Harapan)	Puchong	Selangor
38	Hamzah Zainudin	Malaysian United Indigenous Party (Pakatan Harapan)	Larut	Perak
39	Hannah Yeoh Tseow Suan	Democratic Action Party (Pakatan Harapan)	Segambut	Kuala Lumpur
40	Hasan Bahrom	National Trust Party (Pakatan Harapan)	Tampin	Negeri Sembilan
41	Hasanuddin Yunus	National Trust Party (Pakatan Harapan)	Hulu Langat	Selangor
42	Hassan Abdul Karim	People's Justice Party (Pakatan Harapan)	Pasir Gudang	Johor
43	Hatta Ramli	National Trust Party (Pakatan Harapan)	Lumut	Perak
44	Ikmal Hisham Abdul Aziz	Malaysian United Indigenous Party (Pakatan Harapan)	Tanah Merah	Kelantan
45	Isnaraissah Munirah Majilis	Sabah Heritage Party	Kota Belud	Sabah
46	Jeffrey Kitingan	Homeland Solidarity Party (Gabungan Bersatu Sabah)	Keningau	Sabah
47	Johari Abdul	People's Justice Party (Pakatan Harapan)	Sungai Petani	Kedah
48	Jonathan Yasin	People's Justice Party (Pakatan Harapan)	Ranau	Sabah
49	Jugah Muyang	People's Justice Party (Pakatan Harapan)	Lubok Antu	Sarawak
50	June Leow Hsiad Hui	People's Justice Party (Pakatan Harapan)	Hulu Selangor	Selangor
51	Kamarudin Jaffar	People's Justice Party (Pakatan Harapan)	Bandar Tun Razak	Kuala Lumpur
52	Karuppaiya Muthusamy	People's Justice Party (Pakatan Harapan)	Padang Serai	Kedah
53	Kasthuriraani Patto	Democratic Action Party (Pakatan Harapan)	Batu Kawan	Penang
54	Kelvin Yii Lee Wuen	Democratic Action Party (Pakatan Harapan)	Bandar Kuching	Sarawak
55	Kesavan Subramaniam	People's Justice Party (Pakatan Harapan)	Sungai Siput	Perak
56	Khalid Abdul Samad	National Trust Party (Pakatan Harapan)	Shah Alam	Selangor
57	Khoo Poay Tiong	Democratic Action Party (Pakatan Harapan)	Kota Melaka	Malacca
58	Larry Sng Wei Shien	People's Justice Party (Pakatan Harapan)	Julau	Sarawak
59	Lee Boon Chye	People's Justice Party (Pakatan Harapan)	Gopeng	Perak
60	Liew Vui Keong	Sabah Heritage Party	Batu Sapi	Sabah
61	Lim Guan Eng	Democratic Action Party (Pakatan Harapan)	Bagan	Penang
62	Lim Kit Siang	Democratic Action Party (Pakatan Harapan)	Iskandar Puteri	Johor
63	Lim Lip Eng	Democratic Action Party (Pakatan Harapan)	Kepong	Kuala Lumpur
64	M. Kulasegaran	Democratic Action Party (Pakatan Harapan)	Ipoh Barat	Perak
65	Ma'mun Sulaiman	Sabah Heritage Party	Kalabakan	Sabah
66	Mahathir Mohamad	Malaysian United Indigenous Party (Pakatan Harapan)	Langkawi	Kedah
67	Mahfuz Omar	National Trust Party (Pakatan Harapan)	Pokok Sena	Kedah
68	Mansor Othman	People's Justice Party (Pakatan Harapan)	Nibong Tebal	Penang
69	Maria Chin Abdullah	Independent	Petaling Jaya	Selangor
70	Mas Ermieyati Samsudin	Malaysian United Indigenous Party (Pakatan Harapan)	Masjid Tanah	Malacca
71	Maximus Ongkili	United Sabah Party (Gabungan Bersatu Sabah)	Kota Marudu	Sabah
72	Michael Teo Yu Keng	People's Justice Party (Pakatan Harapan)	Miri	Sarawak
73	Mohamad Sabu	National Trust Party (Pakatan Harapan)	Kota Raja	Selangor
74	Mohamed Azmin Ali	People's Justice Party (Pakatan Harapan)	Gombak	Selangor
75	Mohamed Hanipa Maidin	National Trust Party (Pakatan Harapan)	Sepang	Selangor
76	Mohammadin Ketapi	Sabah Heritage Party	Silam	Sabah
77	Mordi Bimol	Democratic Action Party (Pakatan Harapan)	Mas Gading	Sarawak
78	Muhammad Bakhtiar Wan Chik	People's Justice Party (Pakatan Harapan)	Balik Pulau	Penang
79	Muhyiddin Yassin	Malaysian United Indigenous Party (Pakatan Harapan)	Pagoh	Johor
80	Mujahid Yusof Rawa	National Trust Party (Pakatan Harapan)	Parit Buntar	Perak
81	Mukhriz Mahathir	Malaysian United Indigenous Party (Pakatan Harapan)	Jerlun	Kedah
82	Mustapa Mohamed	Malaysian United Indigenous Party (Pakatan Harapan)	Jeli	Kelantan
83	Natrah Ismail	People's Justice Party (Pakatan Harapan)	Sekijang	Johor
84	Nga Kor Ming	Democratic Action Party (Pakatan Harapan)	Teluk Intan	Perak
85	Ngeh Koo Ham	Democratic Action Party (Pakatan Harapan)	Beruas	Perak
86	Nik Nazmi Nik Ahmad	People's Justice Party (Pakatan Harapan)	Setiawangsa	Kuala Lumpur
87	Noor Azmi Ghazali	Malaysian United Indigenous Party (Pakatan Harapan)	Bagan Serai	Perak
88	Noorita Sual	Democratic Action Party (Pakatan Harapan)	Tenom	Sabah
89	Nor Azrina Surip	People's Justice Party (Pakatan Harapan)	Merbok	Kedah
90	Nurul Izzah Anwar	People's Justice Party (Pakatan Harapan)	Permatang Pauh	Penang
91	Ong Kian Ming	Democratic Action Party (Pakatan Harapan)	Bangi	Selangor
92	Oscar Ling Chai Yew	Democratic Action Party (Pakatan Harapan)	Sibu	Sarawak
93	Pang Hok Liong	Democratic Action Party (Pakatan Harapan)	Labis	Johor
94	P. Prabakaran	People's Justice Party (Pakatan Harapan)	Batu	Kuala Lumpur
95	R. Sivarasa	People's Justice Party (Pakatan Harapan)	Sungai Buloh	Selangor
96	Ramkarpal Singh	Democratic Action Party (Pakatan Harapan)	Bukit Gelugor	Penang
97	Rashid Hasnon	People's Justice Party (Pakatan Harapan)	Batu Pahat	Johor
98	Redzuan Yusof	Malaysian United Indigenous Party (Pakatan Harapan)	Alor Gajah	Malacca
99	Rina Harun	Malaysian United Indigenous Party (Pakatan Harapan)	Titiwangsa	Kuala Lumpur
100	Ronald Kiandee	Malaysian United Indigenous Party (Pakatan Harapan)	Beluran	Sabah
101	Rosol Wahid	Malaysian United Indigenous Party (Pakatan Harapan)	Hulu Terengganu	Terengganu
102	Rozman Isli	Sabah Heritage Party	Labuan	Labuan
103	Rusnah Aluai	People's Justice Party (Pakatan Harapan)	Tangga Batu	Malacca
104	Sanisvara Nethaji	Democratic Action Party (Pakatan Harapan)	Jelutong	Penang
105	Saifuddin Abdullah	People's Justice Party (Pakatan Harapan)	Indera Mahkota	Pahang
106	Saifuddin Nasution Ismail	People's Justice Party (Pakatan Harapan)	Kulim-Bandar Baharu	Kedah
107	Salahuddin Ayub	National Trust Party (Pakatan Harapan)	Pulai	Johor
108	Shabudin Yahaya	Malaysian United Indigenous Party (Pakatan Harapan)	Tasek Gelugor	Penang
109	Shafie Apdal	Sabah Heritage Party	Semporna	Sabah
110	Shahruddin Salleh	Malaysian United Indigenous Party (Pakatan Harapan)	Sri Gading	Johor
111	Sim Tze Tzin	People's Justice Party (Pakatan Harapan)	Bayan Baru	Penang
112	Steven Choong Shiau Yoon	People's Justice Party (Pakatan Harapan)	Tebrau	Johor
113	Steven Sim Chee Keong	Democratic Action Party (Pakatan Harapan)	Bukit Mertajam	Penang
114	Su Keong Siong	Democratic Action Party (Pakatan Harapan)	Kampar	Perak
115	Syed Ibrahim Syed Noh	People's Justice Party (Pakatan Harapan)	Ledang	Johor
116	Syed Saddiq Syed Abdul Rahman	Malaysian United Indigenous Party (Pakatan Harapan)	Muar	Johor
117	Tan Kok Wai	Democratic Action Party (Pakatan Harapan)	Cheras	Kuala Lumpur
118	Tan Yee Kew	People's Justice Party (Pakatan Harapan)	Wangsa Maju	Kuala Lumpur
119	Teh Kok Lim	Democratic Action Party (Pakatan Harapan)	Taiping	Perak
120	Tengku Zulpuri Shah Raja Puji	Democratic Action Party (Pakatan Harapan)	Raub	Pahang
121	Teo Nie Ching	Democratic Action Party (Pakatan Harapan)	Kulai	Johor
122	Teresa Kok Suh Sim	Democratic Action Party (Pakatan Harapan)	Seputeh	Kuala Lumpur
123	Tony Pua Kiam Wee	Democratic Action Party (Pakatan Harapan)	Damansara	Selangor
124	V. Sivakumar	Democratic Action Party (Pakatan Harapan)	Batu Gajah	Perak
125	Wan Azizah Wan Ismail	People's Justice Party (Pakatan Harapan)	Pandan	Selangor
126	Wilfred Madius Tangau	United Pasokmomogun Kadazandusun Murut Organisation	Tuaran	Sabah
127	William Leong Jee Keen	People's Justice Party (Pakatan Harapan)	Selayang	Selangor
128	Willie Mongin	People's Justice Party (Pakatan Harapan)	Puncak Borneo	Sarawak
129	Wong Chen	People's Justice Party (Pakatan Harapan)	Subang	Selangor
130	Wong Hon Wai	Democratic Action Party (Pakatan Harapan)	Bukit Bendera	Penang
131	Wong Kah Woh	Democratic Action Party (Pakatan Harapan)	Ipoh Timor	Perak
132	Wong Ling Biu	Democratic Action Party (Pakatan Harapan)	Sarikei	Sarawak
133	Wong Shu Qi	Democratic Action Party (Pakatan Harapan)	Kluang	Johor
134	Wong Tack	Democratic Action Party (Pakatan Harapan)	Bentong	Pahang
135	Xavier Jayakumar Arulanandam	People's Justice Party (Pakatan Harapan)	Kuala Langat	Selangor
136	Yeo Bee Yin	Democratic Action Party (Pakatan Harapan)	Bakri	Johor
137	Zakaria Edris	Malaysian United Indigenous Party (Pakatan Harapan)	Libaran	Sabah
138	Zuraida Kamaruddin	People's Justice Party (Pakatan Harapan)	Ampang	Selangor
Abstained (59)
1	Aaron Ago Dagang	Sarawak Peoples' Party (Gabungan Parti Sarawak)	Kanowit	Sarawak
2	Abdul Azeez Abdul Rahim	United Malays National Organisation (Barisan Nasional)	Baling	Kedah
3	Abdul Latiff Abdul Rahman	Pan-Malaysian Islamic Party (Gagasan Sejahtera)	Kuala Krai	Kelantan
4	Adham Baba	United Malays National Organisation (Barisan Nasional)	Tenggara	Johor
5	Ahmad Amzad Hashim	Pan-Malaysian Islamic Party (Gagasan Sejahtera)	Kuala Terengganu	Terengganu
6	Ahmad Fadhli Shaari	Pan-Malaysian Islamic Party (Gagasan Sejahtera)	Pasir Mas	Kelantan
7	Ahmad Johnie Zawawi	United Bumiputera Heritage Party (Gabungan Parti Sarawak)	Igan	Sarawak
8	Ahmad Maslan	United Malays National Organisation (Barisan Nasional)	Pontian	Johor
9	Ahmad Marzuk Shaary	Pan-Malaysian Islamic Party (Gagasan Sejahtera)	Pengkalan Chepa	Kelantan
10	Ahmad Tarmizi Sulaiman	Pan-Malaysian Islamic Party (Gagasan Sejahtera)	Sik	Kedah
11	Alexander Nanta Linggi	United Bumiputera Heritage Party (Gabungan Parti Sarawak)	Kapit	Sarawak
12	Annuar Musa	United Malays National Organisation (Barisan Nasional)	Ketereh	Kelantan
13	Anyi Ngau	Progressive Democratic Party (Gabungan Parti Sarawak)	Baram	Sarawak
14	Awang Hashim	Pan-Malaysian Islamic Party (Gagasan Sejahtera)	Pendang	Kedah
15	Bung Moktar Radin	United Malays National Organisation (Barisan Nasional)	Kinabatangan	Sabah
16	Che Abdullah Mat Nawi	Pan-Malaysian Islamic Party (Gagasan Sejahtera)	Tumpat	Kelantan
17	Che Alias Hamid	Pan-Malaysian Islamic Party (Gagasan Sejahtera)	Kemaman	Terengganu
18	Fadillah Yusof	United Bumiputera Heritage Party (Gabungan Parti Sarawak)	Petra Jaya	Sarawak
19	Halimah Mohamed Sadique	United Malays National Organisation (Barisan Nasional)	Kota Tinggi	Johor
20	Hanifah Hajar Taib	United Bumiputera Heritage Party (Gabungan Parti Sarawak)	Mukah	Sarawak
21	Hasbi Habibollah	United Bumiputera Heritage Party (Gabungan Parti Sarawak)	Limbang	Sarawak
22	Hasbullah Osman	United Malays National Organisation (Barisan Nasional)	Gerik	Perak
23	Henry Sum Agong	United Bumiputera Heritage Party (Gabungan Parti Sarawak)	Lawas	Sarawak
24	Ismail Muttalib	United Malays National Organisation (Barisan Nasional)	Maran	Pahang
25	Ismail Sabri Yaakob	United Malays National Organisation (Barisan Nasional)	Bera	Pahang
26	Jalaluddin Alias	United Malays National Organisation (Barisan Nasional)	Jelebu	Negeri Sembilan
27	Ahmad Jazlan Yaakub	United Malays National Organisation (Barisan Nasional)	Machang	Kelantan
28	Khairuddin Aman Razali	Pan-Malaysian Islamic Party (Gagasan Sejahtera)	Kuala Nerus	Terengganu
29	Lukanisman Awang Sauni	United Bumiputera Heritage Party (Gabungan Parti Sarawak)	Sibuti	Sarawak
30	M. Saravanan	Malaysian Indian Congress (Barisan Nasional)	Tapah	Perak
31	Mahdzir Khalid	United Malays National Organisation (Barisan Nasional)	Padang Terap	Kedah
32	Masir Kujat	Sarawak United Party (Gabungan Parti Sarawak)	Sri Aman	Sarawak
33	Mastura Yazid	United Malays National Organisation (Barisan Nasional)	Kuala Kangsar	Perak
34	Nancy Shukri	United Bumiputera Heritage Party (Gabungan Parti Sarawak)	Batang Sadong	Sarawak
35	Nik Abduh Nik Abdul Aziz	Pan-Malaysian Islamic Party (Gagasan Sejahtera)	Bachok	Kelantan
36	Nik Muhammad Zawawi Salleh	Pan-Malaysian Islamic Party (Gagasan Sejahtera)	Pasir Puteh	Kelantan
37	Nizar Zakaria	United Malays National Organisation (Barisan Nasional)	Parit	Perak
38	Noh Omar	United Malays National Organisation (Barisan Nasional)	Tanjong Karang	Selangor
39	Noraini Ahmad	United Malays National Organisation (Barisan Nasional)	Parit Sulong	Johor
40	Ramli Nor	United Malays National Organisation (Barisan Nasional)	Cameron Highlands	Pahang
41	Richard Riot Jaem	Sarawak United Peoples' Party (Gabungan Parti Sarawak)	Serian	Sarawak
42	Robert Lawson Chuat	United Bumiputera Heritage Party (Gabungan Parti Sarawak)	Betong	Sarawak
43	Rohani Abdul Karim	United Bumiputera Heritage Party (Gabungan Parti Sarawak)	Batang Lupar	Sarawak
44	Rubiah Wang	United Bumiputera Heritage Party (Gabungan Parti Sarawak)	Kota Samarahan	Sarawak
45	Sabri Azit	Pan-Malaysian Islamic Party (Gagasan Sejahtera)	Jerai	Kedah
46	Salim Sharif	United Malays National Organisation (Barisan Nasional)	Jempol	Negeri Sembilan
47	Mohd Shahar Abdullah	United Malays National Organisation (Barisan Nasional)	Paya Besar	Pahang
48	Shaharizukirnain Abdul Kadir	Pan-Malaysian Islamic Party (Gagasan Sejahtera)	Setiu	Terengganu
49	Shahidan Kassim	United Malays National Organisation (Barisan Nasional)	Arau	Perlis
50	Shamsul Anuar Nasarah	United Malays National Organisation (Barisan Nasional)	Lenggong	Perak
51	Takiyuddin Hassan	Pan-Malaysian Islamic Party (Gagasan Sejahtera)	Kota Bharu	Kelantan
52	Tiong King Sing	Progressive Democratic Party (Gabungan Parti Sarawak)	Bintulu	Sarawak
53	Tuan Ibrahim	Pan-Malaysian Islamic Party (Gagasan Sejahtera)	Kubang Kerian	Kelantan
54	Wan Hassan Ramli	Pan-Malaysian Islamic Party (Gagasan Sejahtera)	Dungun	Terengganu
55	Wan Junaidi	United Bumiputera Heritage Party (Gabungan Parti Sarawak)	Santubong	Sarawak
56	Wee Ka Siong	Malaysian Chinese Association (Barisan Nasional)	Ayer Hitam	Johor
57	Wilson Ugak Kumbong	Sarawak People's Party (Gabungan Parti Sarawak)	Hulu Rajang	Sarawak
58	Yusuf Abdul Wahab	United Bumiputera Heritage Party (Gabungan Parti Sarawak)	Tanjong Manis	Sarawak
59	Siti Zailah Yusoff	Pan-Malaysian Islamic Party (Gagasan Sejahtera)	Rantau Panjang	Kelantan
Did not participate (8)
1	Ahmad Hamzah	United Malays National Organisation (Barisan Nasional)	Jasin	Malacca
2	Hasan Arifin	United Malays National Organisation (Barisan Nasional)	Rompin	Pahang
3	Hishammuddin Hussein	United Malays National Organisation (Barisan Nasional)	Sembrong	Johor
4	Reezal Merican Naina Merican	United Malays National Organisation (Barisan Nasional)	Kepala Batas	Penang
5	Tajuddin Abdul Rahman	United Malays National Organisation (Barisan Nasional)	Pasir Salak	Perak
6	Tengku Adnan	United Malays National Organisation (Barisan Nasional)	Putrajaya	Putrajaya
7	Tengku Razaleigh Hamzah	United Malays National Organisation (Barisan Nasional)	Gua Musang	Kelantan
8	Zahidi Zainul Abidin	United Malays National Organisation (Barisan Nasional)	Padang Besar	Perlis
Absent (16)
1	Abdul Hadi Awang	Pan-Malaysian Islamic Party (Gagasan Sejahtera)	Marang	Terengganu
2	Abdul Rahman Mohamad	United Malays National Organisation (Barisan Nasional)	Lipis	Pahang
3	Syed Abu Hussin Hafiz	Independent	Bukit Gantang	Perak
4	Ahmad Nazlan Idris	United Malays National Organisation (Barisan Nasional)	Jerantut	Pahang
5	Ahmad Zahid Hamidi	United Malays National Organisation (Barisan Nasional)	Bagan Datok	Perak
6	Azalina Othman Said	United Malays National Organisation (Barisan Nasional)	Pengerang	Johor
7	Idris Jusoh	United Malays National Organisation (Barisan Nasional)	Besut	Terengganu
8	Ismail Mohamed Said	United Malays National Organisation (Barisan Nasional)	Kuala Krau	Pahang
9	Khairy Jamaluddin	United Malays National Organisation (Barisan Nasional)	Rembau	Negeri Sembilan
10	Maszlee Malik	Malaysian United Indigenous Party (Pakatan Harapan)	Simpang Renggam	Johor
11	Muslimin Yahaya	Malaysian United Indigenous Party (Pakatan Harapan)	Sungai Besar	Selangor
12	Najib Razak	United Malays National Organisation (Barisan Nasional)	Pekan	Pahang
13	Nazri Aziz	United Malays National Organisation (Barisan Nasional)	Padang Rengas	Perak
14	Noor Amin Ahmad	People's Justice Party (Pakatan Harapan)	Kangar	Perlis
15	Shamsul Iskandar	People's Justice Party (Pakatan Harapan)	Hang Tuah Jaya	Malacca
16	Yamani Hafez Musa	United Malays National Organisation (Barisan Nasional)	Sipitang	Sabah
Vacant (1)
1	Vacant		Sandakan	Sabah
Source: Division result from an unspecified article on Malaysiakini via Reddit

A separate motion by Santubong MP, Wan Junaidi Tuanku Jaafar, for the bill to be submitted to a special committee of Parliament for a review was supported by only 60 MPs and opposed by 136 MPs. The full sitting of parliament was one MP short as Wong Tien Fatt had died from a heart attack a week prior to the vote. As the bill had failed to reach the required two-thirds majority, it would not get a third reading in Parliament. Despite this, PKR President Anwar Ibrahim said that he was satisfied with the show of support from government MPs and their coalition allies. Prime Minister Mahathir said that, despite the failure of the bill to pass, he did not expect future efforts at amending the constitution to fail. He also stated that, in response to a request by Pontian MP Ahmad Maslan, there was no need to refer the amendment to the Conference of Rulers for review as it was not within their remit, but there would be no opposition from the government if members of parliament sought the formation of a select committee to review the 1963 agreement.

== Domestic response ==
Following the commitment shown by Prime Minister Mahathir, and responding to the need for review, Sabah Social Activist Patrick Sindu suggested that the steering committee set up to review the 1963 agreement should also invite the British government for feedback considering they were party to the original agreement. Sarawak Assistant Minister of Law, State-Federal Relations and Project Monitoring Sharifah Hasidah Sayeed Aman Ghazali pointed out that any review of the 1963 agreement should be aimed at remedying any violation of the terms, spirit and intent of the formation of the Federation of Malaysia. Both the Sabah Council of Churches (SCC) and the Association of Churches in Sarawak (ACS) have called for a full restoration of religious freedom.

The President of the Sabah Law Society Brenndon Keith Soh issued a statement saying that legal action could be taken against the federal government if it fails to fully implement the 1963 agreement. Arnold Puyok, a commenter on Sabah and Sarawak affairs, stressed that the restoration of the territorial status of Sabah and Sarawak should be viewed from a perspective that encompasses Malaysian federalism, and not with a bias towards either Sabah or Sarawak. Sabah Sarawak Rights-Australia New Zealand Incorporation (SSRANZ) President Robert Pei pointed to parallels between the issues surrounding the 1963 agreement and those that arose during the decolonisation of Mauritius in 1968 when the island nation challenged the validity of the 1965 Agreement with the United Kingdom removing the Chagos Archipelago from Mauritian control. According to Pei, the 1963 agreement was invalid from inception as, per a judgement by the International Court of Justice (ICJ), Sabah and Sarawak were both still British colonies, and not sovereign nations, at the time and thus had no power to sign treaties.

Malaysian Chinese Association (MCA) Sabah Women Chief Pamela Yong said that she doubted the "sincerity" of the federal government and perceived it as a move to temporarily placate discontented residents of the two states. State Reform Party (STAR Sarawak) President Lina Soo, Homeland Solidarity Party (STAR Sabah) President, and MP, Jeffrey Kitingan as well as Nancy Shukri of the United Bumiputera Heritage Party (PBB) of Sarawak all issued statements cautioning against rushing the bill and have strongly emphasised the need for a complete review. Dr Kitingan expressed concerns that the amendment was "shrouded in secrecy", while MP Nancy Shukri is one of many voices urging the government to release a draft to them. The Sarawak committee that is acting as consultants on the negotiations have stated they will refrain from commenting until they have been provided with the contents of the bill.

Chief Minister of Sabah, Shafie Apdal, said that once the amendment was passed, Sabah would consider dropping the word "state" from official documents, where as Chief Minister of Sarawak, Abang Abdul Rahman Zohari, said that the word "state" would be dropped completely. Former Sabah Pan-Malaysian Islamic Party (PAS) Deputy Commissioner, and lawyer, Hamid Ismail responded to these statements by claiming that such actions would violate the 1963 agreement. United Sabah Party (PBS) Youth Chief Christopher Mandut countered this claim, instead arguing that the use of the word "state" was an inexact translation of "negeri" as used in the modern political sense. He cited Germany and Italy as examples of states that were not "negeri" but were nonetheless referred to as "states" in the sovereign sense. STAR Sarawak President Lina Soo also issued a statement to this effect, saying that "Borneo States" differs from "states of Malaya" ("negeri"), which specifically referred to constituent territories of a sovereign nation. She claimed that the British used "state", when renaming the "British Borneo Territories" to "Borneo States of Sabah and Sarawak", to refer to "self-governing entities with a history, laws, political and social systems".

Opposition leader Ismail Sabri Yaakob expressed the opposition's support for the bill, but he also had concerns over various aspects of its content, such as the absence of any reference to the 1963 agreement. He also expressed concerns that the bill was being rushed through without a careful review by the Parliamentary Select Committee.

=== Reactions after the amendment bill tabling on 4 April ===
In an interview, Nancy Shukri, the PBB MP representing Batang Sadong, perceived the proposed amendment as a "trap" as she could not see how the hastily proposed amendment could restore the position of Sabah and Sarawak. She also noted the absence of several Sarawak PH MPs when the bill was tabled during its first reading on 4 April and added stated her desire for a deferral of the amendment to a select committee for an in-depth review, with an eye towards ensuring related legislation is also amended accordingly. Nonetheless, she called for members of Gabungan Parti Sarawak (GPS) and Pakatan Harapan (PH) to come together in a show of bipartisanship and to cooperate in ensuring the status of Sarawak is restored. STAR Sarawak President Lina Soo also announced her support for a temporary withdrawal of the bill and to debate it in the Sarawak legislative assembly as well as seek the affirmation of the people. She stated her concern that "Without the safeguards and assurances defined in the explanatory statement, this Bill is a manipulative and repugnant act which is like giving a blank cheque to PH to write, or akin to locking ourselves in a prison and throwing the keys away".

A Sarawakian lawyer, Robert Lau Hui Yew from SUPP, dismissed the proposed amendment as "just playing with the construction of a sentence". According to his analysis, the amendment merely splits the 1976 agreement into two parts, but is effectively the same sentence. He further alleges that the drafting of the amendment could have been a simple process and yet "the drafters are trying to confuse and hold on to the assimilated nature of Malaya in the guise of Malaysia". Similar views were also expressed by former Sabah Chief Minister, and Sabah Progressive Party (SAPP) President, Yong Teck Lee together with SUPP Youth Chief Michael Tiang and Sarawak MP Tiong King Sing.

Sarawak Legal Counsel JC Fong further said that the federal government should redefine the "federation term" to achieve equal status for both entities as through the bill reading, there will still be 13 states in Malaysia including Sarawak and Sabah based on Clause (2) in the bill. PBS President Maximus Ongkili described the proposed amendment as a "disappointment" as there is really nothing in it when Sabah continued to be mentioned as one of the 13 states through the tabling on 4 April when the actual reason for the amendment is to restore the position of the two entities as equal partners, adding that is why most of the opposition MPs from both entities proposing a review by a select committee for a study and modification on the bill which then will be referred to the two current state assemblies for debate and adoption before the national Parliament being allowed to make a vote. Another Sabah MP Anifah Aman urge the federal government not to be hasty with a deep study are required before its tabling as the issue has long been a thorny issue and a cause of growing unhappiness amongst Sabahans and Sarawakians residents. Universiti Malaysia Sabah (UMS) political analyst Lee Kuok Tiung calling the amendment as "nonsensical", saying that with such definition during the tabling, he wondering how the two entities can be equal partners. Former Minister in the Prime Minister Department and United Sabah People's Party (PBRS) President Joseph Kurup said the bill is far from what the people in the two entities wished but urging the matter should not being prolonged as it will causing further tense relationship between the two entities with the federation. As a solution, Kurup calling Minister Liew to postponed the tabling and held discussion with all of the involved MPs before presenting the bill again in the Parliament for its second reading and debate. The Vice President of Liberal Democratic Party (LDP) Yew Chau Khiong said the amendment bill is too "hasty" in its first reading, calling the governments of the two entities together with the Advocates Association of Sarawak (AAS) and Sabah Law Society to make a more in-depth study followed by a discussion on the proposed amendment before being referred to a select committee in Parliament prior to debate and voting as an hasty amendment which just passed for the sake of achieving an objective will only resulting in consequences that affecting the lives of future generations as evidenced in the current situation of both entities.

In response to the claim made by Minister Liew who said the two Chief Ministers have been consulted over the bill, Sarawak Chief Minister Abang Zohari made a clear statement that no approval was given by both Chief Ministers from Sabah and Sarawak on the amendment in its current form with the cabinet committee appointed for the review of the 1963 agreement never discussed the actual wording of the amendment in its meetings. Abang Zohari further explained that they will support any amendment to the Federal Constitution or any law that seeks to restore their rights as according to the 1963 agreement but the amendments must not merely in form but of substantive nature. PBB also respond to the appeal made by Chong Chieng Jen of the DAP in Sarawak through its Information Chief Idris Buang who said the federal government need to respond to a list of claims made by the Sarawak government delegation in the committee reviewing the 1963 agreement which includes Sarawak's stand on non-negotiable matters pertaining to its rights over land, continental shelf, natural resources (oil and gas and mining rights) as well as the special grants and capitation grants along with the need for equal share of parliamentary seats following the exit of Singapore from the federation in 1965 as the proposed amendment is just not simply to get it done to prevent getting a supposed rights restoration which is just "beautiful in the outside, but actually empty inside".

=== Response by the federal government and other allied parties on the definition of the bill ===
Prime Minister Mahathir said afterwards that it is up to Sabah and Sarawak MPs to support the bill, adding that what they have announced is that they will recognise the amendment as an agreement among three entities — the Federation of Malaya, Sabah and Sarawak. But as the previous constitution did not make it clear, they have to amend the constitution by getting two-thirds majority vote in the Parliament. Minister Liew also said that both Sabah and Sarawak leaders have been consulted and have deliberated over the issue with both entities will be termed as territories, telling that if the opposition MPs want to establish a separate special select committee on the matter, it can be done but since it is a government bill, it will not initiate a proposal to establish one. During Mahathir visit to Sabah on 6 April, the Prime Minister assuring the public that the amendment is not merely a cosmetic with the federal government will fulfill its promise for the two entities to get equal status to Peninsular Malaysia, officially declaring that:

We promised we will recognise the signatures to the Malaysia 1963 agreement was by Sabah, Sarawak and Peninsular Malaysia. We will recognise these three regions as members of the federation.

— Mahathir Mohamad, Prime Minister of Malaysia.

Responding to the criticism towards him and the federal government on the bill content definition during the tabling, Minister Liew explained that through the 1963 agreement, every party have agreed on the definition but it became null in 1966 following the Singapore exit from the federation in 1965 where an amendment was made in the year of the nullification. In 1976, another amendment was made to placed both Sabah and Sarawak as "negeri" by dropping the words like "the States of Malaya, namely" and "the Borneo States, namely" from the original definition of the States of the Federation of Malaysia where it receive two-thirds majority vote from the Parliament including the support from the MPs of the two entities itself thus saying the leaders from the two only realising their mistake recently when they who are supposed to oppose the previous 1976 amendment. The statement are similarly echoed by Sarawak PH Chairman Chong Chieng Jen who agreed that it is actually PBB and SUPP MPs who support the downgrade of Sarawak status to one of the 13 states in Malaysia when they were still part of the BN coalition without realising its implications today.

On 7 April, both the Democratic Action Party (DAP) branches in East Malaysia through Chong Chieng Jen for Sarawak and Chan Foong Hin for Sabah appeal to both opposition MPs in the two entities to stop playing politics and remove their egos as the bill will soon be debated and put to vote on 9 April, adding that co-operation between government and opposition MPs are needed to undo the wrongdoings of the past as any failure to pass the bill in the end will only resulting to negative consequences on the negotiation for the rights in the 1963 agreement. Chan explained the amendment were indeed seeking to reverse the previous amendment in 1976 which placed both entities as one of 13 states in Malaysia as the 1963 agreement committee are still doing its work with more amendments to come soon. On the reason behind the exclusion of several phrases as mentioned before, Chong stated that it was due to an earlier discussion made by the committee who feel both of the entities are not the only states on the island of Borneo as there are also the country of Brunei and Indonesian Kalimantan provinces, explaining that the proposed amendment is similar in structure to the original Article 4 (1) of the Federal Constitution even with the exclusion.

Similar views were also expressed earlier by Sarawak PKR lawmaker See Chee How who urging every MPs to put aside their political differences to fulfill the long-waited aspiration and hope of all Sarawakians and Sabahans to right the wrong of the last 43 years, adding that the committee and various working groups on the matters are still deliberating and working with steps are being taken to devolve the autonomous powers to both entities with their report is scheduled to be finalised and revealed by the committee in June. Sarawak Assemblyman from Padungan Wong King Wei further said that opposition MPs should not doubt the present federal government sincerities to restore the rights of the two entities as if they were not care on the issues, they will just ignore by not doing anything like in the past over the matters. He elaborated that several steps as the evidence of the federal government commitment have been shown such as the forming of a special committee on the 1963 agreement and even tabled an amendment bill to the Parliament, adding that the proposed amendment is just one of the first steps to restore the two entities rights as when their status have been restored, both entities can discuss further in the round table of the committee for further negotiations on their rights.

Other PKR MP from Sarawak such as Willie Mongin said the federal government move for the bill tabling is good as one of the first step to legally restore the two entities rights as according to the original 1963 agreement, but openly expressing that he is "displeased" with the words used in the proposed amendment and believed the wording could be refined, adding his proposals that "Sarawak should be stated as Negara Sarawak (the Country of Sarawak) and Sabah as Negara Sabah (the Country of Sabah), not as one [of] the states in the federation" as the previous wording may indicate that both entities are just one of the states in the federation in par with Malay Peninsula states that will causing confusion and misinterpretation. The United Pasokmomogun Kadazandusun Murut Organisation (UPKO) also distancing their opinion differ from other government allied parties who simply supporting the bill, the party President Wilfred Madius Tangau agreed with the suggestion by opposition MPs to refer the amendment to the special committee before the second reading in Parliament on the evening of 9 April, stressing that the process must be fulfilled if the federal government was really serious in implementing the 1963 agreement and restoring their rights since a bill that was tabled in a rush will only drawn negative reactions from various parties in both of the entities as the amendment have implications that will subsequently transformed the federation governance. Ronald Kiandee of the Malaysian United Indigenous Party (PPBM) said the bill must be approved by the MPs from both entities as it had long been anticipated to lift the ranks of the current two states.

=== Aftermath of the bill second reading and subsequent voting ===
Prime Minister Mahathir Mohamad said he did not expect the federal government bid to amend the constitution will fail, explaining that even with the unsatisfied result, they need to respect the decision made by opposition as every lawmaker has the right to vote "whatever they have set their sights on" and stressing the bill was not done in haste. Deputy Prime Minister Wan Azizah Wan Ismail also expressed her deep disappointment over the result since she put a deep hope for the return of both entities status, adding that she thought when seeing the debate session everyone seemed to have agreed. PKR President Anwar Ibrahim blamed the failure on the passage of the bill for the constitutional amendment to both UMNO and BN who are majority seen jointly choose to be "abstained" without giving their concrete reason in the voting, citing that since their long period of administrating the country, they did not even want to review the amendment of the country. He further added that the amendment was very meaningful and historic to the people of the country, especially to Sabah and Sarawak since the matter has been debated for a long time and we have heard the complaints of frustration and sadness of the people from both of the entities, adding that he could not understand why some people still disputed the matter when the old administration could not even moved an inch when they were in power for more than half a century. Sabah Chief Minister Shafie Apdal expressed his very deep disappointment on the failure to amend the constitution. In a statement, he expressed:

You can imagine, in particular, fundamental things that we cannot agree on and vote for it, what more other things that we can realise. It's already 55 years, we have waited for such a long time ... we are not saying that we should be in a hurry but, for God's sake, this is 55 years, this is a fundamental thing.

— Shafie Apdal, Chief Minister of Sabah.

Despite the deep disappointment, Shafie said the result of the voting is not the end of their struggle for equalities but instead its just becoming the first one after 55 years with the struggle will continues by all means, adding that he refuse to blaming anyone on the result when asked by the media whether he thought their counterpart Sarawak was to be blame for placing their politics above the bill with the Sabah government would continue their co-operation together with Sarawak government for the return of their rights. Former Chief Minister of Sabah and MP of UPKO, Bernard Giluk Dompok opined that all lawmakers should support the bill because the federal government had done what it was supposed to do to return the two entities status as before the 1976 amendment. Petaling Jaya MP and social activist Maria Chin Abdullah called the 59 MPs who choose to abstained from the voting have shown through their own action that they are really not committed to the country reform agenda where they were blinded by their own political interests and have forsaken the struggles and aspirations of the people in the two entities which as a direct result of their conducts, these MPs have effectively retained both Sabah and Sarawak as only states in the federation of Malaysia. Minister of International Trade and Industry and President of the Sabah Heritage Party (WARISAN) Darell Leiking said the majority decision taken by opposition MPs evidently showing they have no dignity towards their voters, adding that it was a historical moment for the country when the Prime Minister have willing to read out the rationale behind amending the constitution which would have reinstated our status to the pre-1976 amendment, but instead all of these efforts been wasted by the opposition MPs. The PH coalition in Sarawak through their Secretary Senator, Alan Ling expressed their great disappointment as the historical opportunity to restore both entities status had been dashed to the ground by the decision of the opposition to abstained from voting, adding that the opposition especially GPS had intentionally failing the aspirations of Sarawakians which is totally unacceptable and beyond any justification with any further excuses given by GPS MPs have no merit as the wording on the proposed amendment have been agreed to be redefined as in the original version of 1963 agreement. Despite the failure of the bill passage, Minister Liew has stated that they would never give up and would continue to fight for the people especially for those in the two entities, calling the action by a small group of parliamentarians not voting for the amendment was unreasonable and detrimental to the society with the moment will forever be remembered and identified by the generation as those who preventing the return of the two entities status.

GPS through its SUPP President Sim Kui Hian said the blame should not been thrown on them, but instead the federal government should have listened earlier to their demands to amend the definition of the "federation" as a federation that were established through the 1963 agreement, not under the federation term as inscribed in the 1957 Malaya Agreement. STAR Sarawak President Lina Soo called the failure to pass the bill as a "landmark victory" for Sarawakians and Sabahans, praising that the political maturity of the people in the two entities has reached new heights which is not seen since the formation of the country. She adding that the people had voiced out loud and clear that any constitutional amendment without adhering to the principle of the 1963 agreement must be rejected where she also insisted that any constitutional amendment which would have subsequent effect to the political position of the two entities must first be brought before the current state legislative assembly for legitimacy. Responding to the "landmark victory" as claimed by opposition allied parties, Sabah Beluran MP Ronald Kiandee described the move by the opposition as just to politicising the issue too much with their abstention from the bill voting just for the sake of opposing. Former law lecturer Abdul Aziz Bari also said those opposition MPs who didn't vote for the amendment bill could have actually used their debate time to point out what they saw as lacking in it and ask for the gaps to be filled, calling the suggestion made by an opposition MP from Pengerang, Azalina Othman Said for the need of a select committee before the bill tabling are actually just to wasting the time. The adviser of the Sabah government on the 1963 agreement, Zainnal Ajamain said following the result, the two entities lost their opportunity to restore their status as equal partners. In a statement, he said:

We know that in the first reading there are problems, but in the second reading [the content] is taken from MA63, word by word, unchanged … then it was also rejected. [The defeat of the amendment] has big implications. We have been waiting for 55 years, then we have this rare opportunity. The opportunity is there, but some people are still dissatisfied … It's up to them. I think the dissatisfied party should now think deeply, to reflect on what has happened and read as well understand [the 1963 agreement] better.

An independent Sabah MP, Anifah Aman stated that even the Parliament failed to pass the bill, the fight for equal partnership will never end. The leader of the opposition, Ismail Sabri Yaakob stressed that even the opposition choose to abstained in the voting, the bill are not actually lost since not even a single opposition MPs rejecting the bill, adding that the federal government should not have been rushed for its tabling in the Parliament but instead taken it up for a thorough discussion at the parliamentary select committee as if the joint committee have expressing their views along with their facts, both can jointly support the amendment since he himself also questioned the amendment bid's significance to the two entities which according to him would only highlight the difference between those in the peninsula and those in Borneo from a geographical perspective. Similar opinion were also expressed by an UMNO Supreme Council Member and former MP Abdul Rahman Dahlan who said that he did not blame the Prime Minister for what has happened as the bill was originally drafted by Minister Liew who failed to understand what opposition MPs from the two entities really wanted with regard to the amendment, adding that if the bill was earlier sent to the select committee, it surely be a win-win situation for all concerned parties with the Prime Minister would receive praises from all quarters. Similar views were expressed by Sarawak Chief Minister Abang Abdul Rahman Zohari. Another opposition MP of MCA from Ayer Hitam, Wee Ka Siong said the proposed bill is done in rush and merely a cosmetic change, stressing that the opposition only want the bill to be looked into carefully and diligently for the constitutional amendment. Nevertheless, with the unaccomplished goals, Sabah Deputy Chief Minister Wilfred Madius Tangau hopes the steering committee on the 1963 agreement chaired by the Prime Minister would meet as soon as possible to further discuss steps that will be taken by the Sabah government. On the proposal to re-tabling the bill in the Parliament as the bill should be referred first to a special committee, Prime Minister Mahathir answered the question that a discussion will be held with involved MPs on the matter with the re-tabling would depend on "needs". The Sabah Legislative Assembly through Chief Minister Shafie had announced they would table emergency motion regarding the 1963 agreement in the nearest time to regain their rights despite the bill failure following the request made by one of the assemblyman, Masidi Manjun. On 18 April, the Sabah assembly unanimously passed a motion to endorse the proposed amendment if it gets re-tabled in the national Parliament. The Sarawak Legislative Assembly follow suits on 30 April by unanimously approves motion for constitutional amendments on Sarawak's rights with the motion includes a provision for the amendment of Article 1(2) of the Federal Constitution by inserting "pursuant to Malaysia Agreement 1963" which subsequently read as: "The States of the Federation, pursuant to Malaysian Agreement 1963, shall be".

Local analysts hold the view that the failure for the bill passage is not end on the struggle of both entities to restore their status, urging both sides of political factions either from the government and opposition to stop blaming each other and moving forwards towards a solution for the betterment of the residents in the two entities. Other political analysts also in the position that the opposition faction of GPS did not simply want the bill to fail, but instead just want to ensure it is done correctly, adding that despite the bill failure, the federal government must move forward to correct the long historical grievances in the two entities before it is escalated into far more secessionist option with the growing frustration and unhappiness.

During the celebration of Sarawak Day on 22 July, Sarawak Association for People's Aspiration (SAPA) reminded the federal government to not wasting further time to restore Sarawak's rights and status under the 1963 agreement with the increase independence sentiment among the people. Further on 25 July, Sabah Chief Minister Shafie said that Prime Minister Mahathir will announce the restoration of both Sabah and Sarawak rights in the nearest time. On 17 December, Minister Liew announced that the proposed amendment to be re-tabled in March 2020 following a reach consensus through a three-way meeting between Prime Minister Mahathir Mohamad, Sabah Chief Minister Shafie Apdal and Sarawak Chief Minister Abang Zohari held at the Prime Minister's office on 16 December 2019.

== 2021 amendment to the Constitution of Malaysia ==
Two years after the failed attempt, on 16 September 2021, Prime Minister Ismail Sabri Yaakob pledged to look into issues relating to Sabah and Sarawak via the Special Council on Malaysia Agreement 1963. The amendments were tabled on 3 November 2021, consisting of four changes: classifying Sabah and Sarawak as "Borneo States" and listed them separately from the "States of Malaya", defining Malaysia Day as the day when Sabah and Sarawak joined, defining "Federation" as the formation of Malaysia rather than Malaya, and changes to the inheritance of Sarawak native status. On 14 December 2021, the proposed amendment was passed in the Parliament unanimously with 199 votes in favour, and 21 MPs absent from the 6-hour long debate. The law came into force on 11 February 2022.

== See also ==
- List of amendments to the Constitution of Malaysia
- Separatist movements of Malaysia
- Separation of Singapore from Malaysia
