= Malaysia Forever =

Song

Malaysia Forever is a folk song written by Bobby Gimby in the early 1960s. The title of the song is a rough translation of the Malay phrase, "Hidup Malaysia" (literally, Long Live Malaysia). It was written to celebrate the formation of Malaysian federation in 1963. Tunku Abdul Rahman, the then Prime Minister of the Federation called the song Malaysia Forever as the unofficial national anthem of Malaysia. The song was recorded in Kuala Lumpur and Singapore.

== Overview ==
Malaysia Forever is a folk song with a length of 2 minutes sung by the Choir of the Marymount Vocational School in Singapore. On the days before the merger, it was taught to school children prior to merger and became an instant hit when it was broadcast over the air-waves of all parts of Malaysia. The song was broadcast on nationwide radio every National Day until Singapore's expulsion from Malaysia on 9 August 1965 due to political and economical disputes, in which the song quickly lost its popularity among both sides.

== Lyrics ==
Let's get together, sing a happy song

Malaysia forever, 10 million strong

Land of the free, marching as one

Ready to share in every way, so let's get it done, get it done, get it done

We're all in the same boat, steady as we go

Let's pull together, everybody row (row, row, row!)

It's right, it's the answer, there's no other way

To be good neighbours every day!

Malaysia forever, ever more (doo doo doo doo doo)

United for liberty (doo doo doo doo doo)

Home of the happy people

Just you wait and see (wait and see, wait and see, wait and see!)

Let's get together, sing a happy song

Malaysia forever, 10 million strong

We're ready for merger, let's open the door

To a Malaysia forever, ever more!

Malaysia forever

Malaysia forever

Malaysia forever

Malaysia forever

Malaysia forever

== See also ==
- Singapore in Malaysia
- Malaysia Day
