= List of constitutional amendments =

List of constitutional amendments

- Amendments to the Constitution of Bangladesh
- Constitutional amendments under the French Fifth Republic
- List of amendments of the Constitution of India
- Amendments to the Constitution of Ireland
- List of amendments to the Constitution of Malaysia
- Amendments to the Constitution of Pakistan
- List of amendments to the Constitution of the United States
