= Malaysia Day =

Public holiday in 16 September

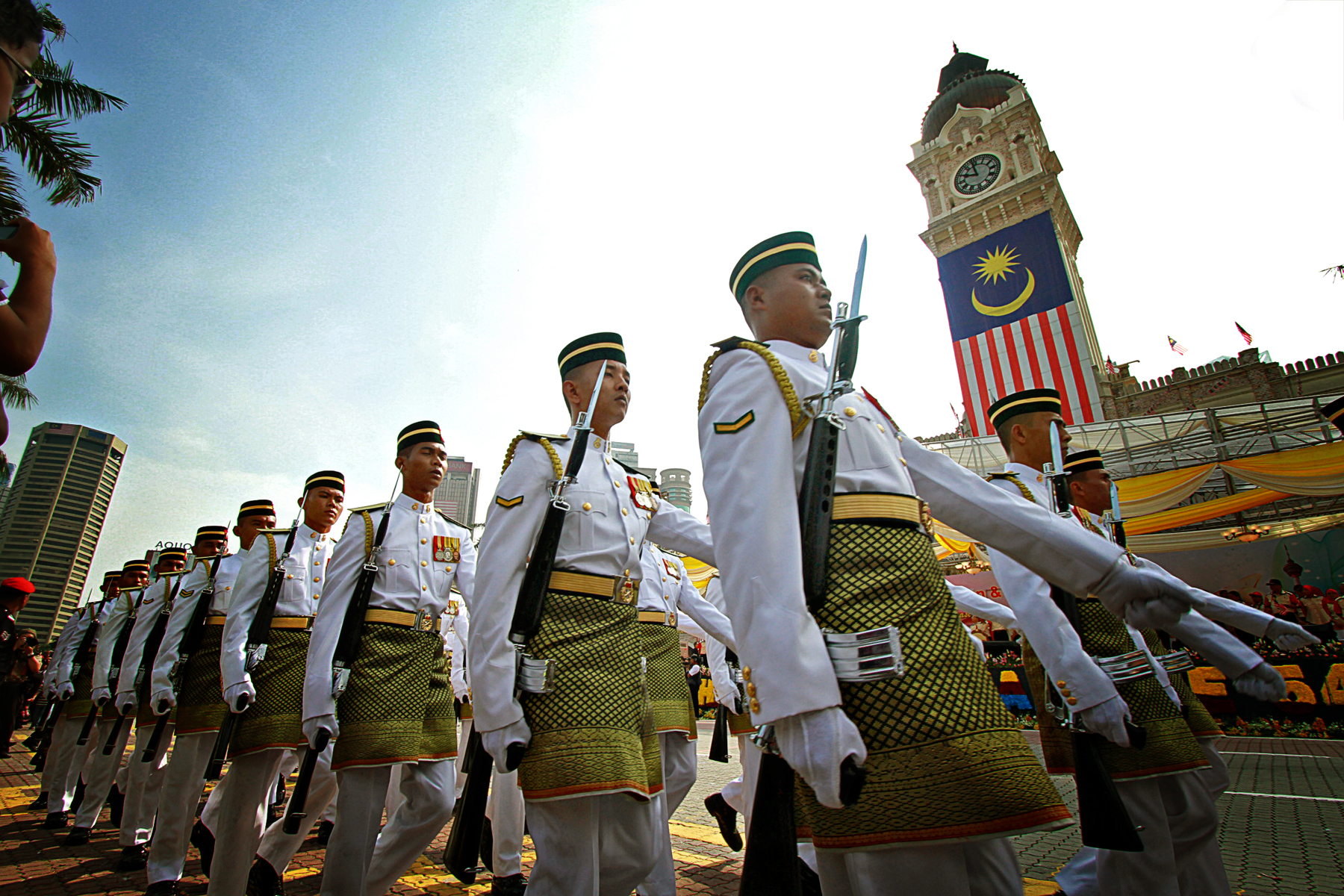
- Malaysia Day celebrations in 2011
- Official name: Hari Malaysia
- Observed by: Malaysians
- Type: National
- Significance: Marks the establishment of the Malaysian federation
- Date: 16 September
- Next time: 16 September 2027
- Frequency: Annual

Malaysia Day (Malay: Hari Malaysia) is a public holiday observed nationwide on 16 September each year since 2010. It marks the anniversary of the signing of the Malaysia Agreement, which came into effect on that date in 1963 and led to the creation of Malaysia. The agreement brought together Malaya (independent since 1957), North Borneo (later renamed Sabah), Sarawak and Singapore into a single federation. Singapore later separated from the federation on 9 August 1965, and Malaysia Day is no longer observed there.

In East Malaysia, many regard Malaysia Day as the country's true "national day", arguing that 31 August commemorates the independence of Malaya, which was a separate political entity to Malaysia.

== History ==
=== Union of Malaya, Singapore, Sarawak and North Borneo ===
The planned date for the formation of the new federation was 1 June 1963, but the event was postponed to 31 August 1963 to coincide with the sixth anniversary of Hari Merdeka of Malaya. Several issues relating to the objections of neighbouring Indonesia and the Philippines to the formation of Malaysia delayed the declaration further to 16 September of the same year. No referendum was conducted in North Borneo or Sarawak; instead, the United Nations (UN) carried out a general survey involving interviews with approximately 4,000 people and receiving 2,200 memorandums from groups and private individuals. The Cobbold Commission, led by Cameron Cobbold, 1st Baron Cobbold, was also established to assess whether the peoples of North Borneo and Sarawak wished to join Malaysia. The Commission's findings indicated substantial support for the formation of Malaysia among the peoples of Sabah and Sarawak as equal partners. Meanwhile, Singapore held a referendum on 1 September 1962, in which all three options endorsed integration into Malaysia based on varying degrees of autonomy, with no option to reject the merger.

The formation of Malaysia proceeded under the terms of the Malaysia Agreement, signed in 1963 by the United Kingdom, the Federation of Malaya, Sarawak, North Borneo, and Singapore. This agreement established the conditions under which the component states would be federated under a new constitution. It included in its annexes the "Malaysia Bill" (Annex A) and the constitutions of Sabah (Annex B), Sarawak (Annex C) and Singapore (Annex D). Prior to the federation, Singapore had achieved self-governance on 3 July 1959 and Sarawak had achieved self-governance on 22 July 1963. The "Malaysia Bill" was introduced in the Malayan Parliament on 9 July 1963 and received royal assent from Tuanku Syed Putra, the Yang di-Pertuan Agong, on 29 August 1963. North Borneo (now Sabah) became self-governing on 31 August 1963, coinciding with the sixth anniversary of Malayan independence and marking the original intended date for the Malaysia Agreement.

Until 2010, Malaysia Day was generally regarded as less significant, particularly in West Malaysia, and was not commemorated annually. The first two unofficial observances occurred in 1973, marking a decade since the federation's creation, and in 1988, celebrating the silver jubilee of Sabah and Sarawak's accession into the federation as member states. It was only in 2010 that Malaysia Day was formally recognised as a nationwide public holiday after lobbying by East Malaysians, acknowledging its importance in commemorating the federation and recognising the contributions of Sabah and Sarawak to the formation of the nation.

=== Elevated to national holiday ===
Prior to 2010, Malaysia Day was observed as a state public holiday only in Sabah and Sarawak, with subsequent unofficial commemorations in 1993 – pearl jubilee or 30th anniversary, 1998 – coral jubilee or 35th anniversary, 2003 – ruby jubilee or 40th anniversary, and 2008 – sapphire jubilee or 45th anniversary.

Prime Minister Najib Razak announced during a parliamentary Q&A session on 19 October 2009 that Malaysia Day would become a nationwide public holiday beginning in 2010, giving Malaysians two celebrations related to the country's independence and sovereignty. The inaugural nationwide celebrations began in 2011, when Hari Merdeka was observed simultaneously due to that year's 31 August coinciding with Eid-al-Fitr celebrations.

Subsequent Malaysia Day celebrations marked important milestones. For the 55th anniversary in 2018, under the Pakatan Harapan government, Prime Minister Mahathir Mohamad had pledged to restore a more autonomous status to Sabah and Sarawak in accordance with the original Malaysia Agreement, recognising them as equal partners rather than mere component states. After the failure of the proposed 2019 amendment to the Constitution of Malaysia, In 2020, Prime Minister Muhyiddin Yassin reiterated a similar commitment to maintaining Sabah and Sarawak as equal partners in the federation. A similar amendment in 2021 passed under Prime Minister Ismail Sabri Yaakob.

== Celebration locations ==
Ever since Malaysia Day began to be officially celebrated in 2011, national-level celebrations have been held in various cities across Malaysia, but more so in East Malaysia. In 2020 and 2021, smaller scale celebrations were held due to the COVID-19 pandemic.

City	Years host
Kuala Lumpur	2011
Bintulu	2012, 2016
Kuching	2013, 2019, 2023, 2026
Miri	2014
Kota Kinabalu	2015, 2017, 2018, 2021, 2024
Sibu	2020
Malacca City	2022
Butterworth	2025

Locations of national-level Malaysia Day celebration

== In popular culture ==
Malaysia Forever was a song composed by Bobby Gimby to celebrate the Formation of Malaysia on 16 September 1963. Bobby Gimby received the nickname "The Pied Piper of Canada" after the Prime Minister nicked Gimby "the Pied Piper from Canada". The song was recorded in Kuala Lumpur and Singapore. It is a folk song with a length of 2 minutes sung by the Choir of the Marymount Vocational School (Singapore). On the days before the merger, it was taught to school children and became an instant hit when it was broadcast over the air-waves throughout Malaysia. The song fell out of use when Singapore was expelled from Malaysia and became its own sovereign country.

== See also ==
- Independence Day (Malaysia)
- Sarawak Independence Day
- North Borneo Self-government Day
- 20-point agreement (Sabah)
- 18-point agreement (Sarawak)
- History of Malaysia
- Singapore in Malaysia
- Malaysia Forever
