= Laurie Bower =

Canadian jazz musician (1933–2016)

- Born: Lawrence Wayne Bower; August 31, 1933; Kirkland Lake, Ontario, Canada
- Died: January 19, 2016 (aged 82); Toronto, Ontario, Canada
- Occupations: Musician; bandleader

Lawrence Wayne Bower (August 31, 1933 - January 19, 2016) was a Canadian jazz musician, most noted as the bandleader of the Laurie Bower Singers.

Originally from Kirkland Lake, Ontario, Bower studied trombone and choral arrangement at the University of Toronto, and began his career as a trombonist in the jazz bands of Benny Louis, Ozzie Williams, Ellis McClintock, Art Hallman and Mart Kenney. He subsequently joined the Five Playboys, a vocal quintet who performed a number of times on The Jack Kane Show.

Striking out on his own as a session musician and vocal arranger, he became more widely known as the conductor of the children's choir on Bobby Gimby's 1967 Canadian centennial anthem "Canada". In this era he formed the Laurie Bower Singers, which started out as a vocal quintet before expanding into a rotating collective of session vocalists who performed and recorded with the band when available. In addition to Bower, other members of the Laurie Bower Singers over their career included Tommy Ambrose, Kathy Collier, Vern Kennedy, Patty Van Evera, Cal Dodd, Bill Misener, Colina Phillips, Judy Tate and Stephanie Taylor.

The collective recorded 11 albums featuring harmony vocal arrangements of pop, folk and jazz songs between 1968 and 1990, and released singles including a cover of "I'd Like to Teach the World to Sing". They also became known as regular singers of television commercial jingles, and were part of the recording of the theme song to the 1967 animated version of Spider-Man alongside the Billy Van Singers.

With Jackie Rae and Micky Erbe, he was also a cofounder of The Spitfire Band, a jazz band active in the 1980s.

Following the retirement of the bands, Bower continued to record as a session musician, as well as having select solo jazz performances including appearances at the Toronto Jazz Festival into the 2000s. In this era, he also had a small acting role, playing Johnny Mandel in the 2000 television film Livin' for Love: The Natalie Cole Story.

Bower died on January 19, 2016, in Toronto.

== Discography ==
- Feelin' - 1968
- Look What They've Done to These Songs, Ma... - 1971
- Take Me Home Country Roads - 1971
- Morning Has Broken - 1972
- Wish I Was a Plane - 1973
- Back Home Again - 1975
- Got a Feelin' for Love - 1976
- Looks Like We Made It - 1977
- You - 1978
- When You Say Goodbye - 1980
- It Goes Like It Goes - 1981

== Awards ==
Award	Date of ceremony	Category	Work	Result	Ref.
ACTRA Awards	1973	Best Variety Performer	The Laurie Bower Singers	Nominated	
Juno Awards	1974	Best Pop Music Album	Wish I Were a Plane	Nominated	
