= 2021 amendment to the Constitution of Malaysia =

Constitutional amendment

Constitution (Amendment) Act 2022

Parliament of Malaysia
- Long title: An Act to amend the Federal Constitution.
- Citation: Act A1642
- Territorial extent: Malaysia
- Passed by: Dewan Rakyat
- Passed: 14 December 2021
- Passed by: Dewan Negara
- Passed: 23 December 2021
- Royal assent: 19 January 2022
- Commenced: 11 February 2022

Legislative history

First chamber: Dewan Rakyat
- Bill title: Constitution (Amendment) Bill 2021
- Bill citation: D.R 11/2021
- Introduced by: Wan Junaidi bin Tuanku Jaafar
- First reading: 3 November 2021
- Second reading: 14 December 2021
- Third reading: 14 December 2021

Second chamber: Dewan Negara
- Bill title: Constitution (Amendment) Bill 2021
- First reading: 21 December 2021
- Second reading: 23 December 2021
- Third reading: 23 December 2021

Amends
- Constitution of Malaysia

Related legislation
- Constitution (Amendment) Act 1976; Constitution (Amendment) Bill 2019

Summary
- To restore the constitutional status of Sabah and Sarawak according to the Malaysia Agreement.
- Status: In force

The Constitution (Amendment) Act 2022 amended the Constitution of Malaysia with the objective of restoring the status of Sabah and Sarawak as equal partners to Malaya within the Federation of Malaysia. This legislative measure was designed to give effect to the provisions of the Malaysia Agreement of 1963 (commonly abbreviated as MA63). The amendment was passed unanimously by the Dewan Rakyat, the elected chamber of the Parliament of Malaysia, on 14 December 2021, and entered into force upon receiving royal assent on 11 February 2022.

== Overview ==
In 2019, the then Pakatan Harapan federal government had proposed a similar amendment to the Constitution, which would have amended Article 1(2) to restore its 1963 wording defining Sabah and Sarawak as constituent territories of Malaysia. While supported by a majority of MPs, the amendment failed to achieve the 2/3 majority required to pass a constitutional amendment. Two years later after the fall of the Pakatan Harapan government, Prime Minister Ismail Sabri Yaakob announced on 16 September 2021 he was looking into issues relating to Sabah and Sarawak via the Special Council on Malaysia Agreement 1963. As Prime Minister, Ismail chaired the negotiations, joined by the Chief Ministers of Sabah and Sarawak, as well as eight federal ministers.

Subsequently on 19 October 2021, Minister in the Prime Minister's Department (Sabah and Sarawak Affairs) Maximus Ongkili announced a bill to be tabled in the coming Parliament sitting after the Special Council on Malaysia Agreement 1963 agreed to Articles 1(2) and 160(2) of the Federal Constitution to restore Sabah and Sarawak as equal partners to Peninsular Malaysia. The same meeting also saw the council agree to empower both the Sabah and Sarawah governments to issue deep fishing licences as opposed to the federal government currently.

=== Details ===
The amendments were eventually tabled by Minister in the Prime Minister's Department (Law and Parliament) Wan Junaidi on 3 November 2021. They consisted of four changes:

- amending Article 1(2) to restore the definition of Sabah and Sarawak as constituent "territories" of Malaysia
- adding to Article 160(2) a formal definition of Malaysia Day as the day when Sabah and Sarawak joined the Federation
- amending in Article 160(2) the definition of the Federation
- amending in Article 161A the definition of natives of Sabah and Sarawak

The amendments to Article 161A included a repeal of Article 161A(7) which provided for a specific federally-imposed definition of a native of Sarawak. This gave the Sarawak state government autonomy to define who could be considered a native of Sarawak instead. The Dayak Chamber of Commerce and Industry welcomed this amendment in particular, calling it a "dream come true" because it would allow the Sarawak state government to include children of mixed marriages and of native tribes not listed in Article 161A(7) in the definition of a Sarawak native. According to the Chamber, the legal ramifications of the status quo were: "Under the Sarawak Land Code, dealings in native lands, such as transfers, between a native parent and his or her child of mixed marriage are prohibited because the child is not considered a native under the law."

On 14 December 2021, after 6 hours of debate, the proposed amendment was passed in the Dewan Rakyat unanimously with 199 votes in favour, and 21 MPs not voting. On 6 January 2022, Minister Ongkili announced the setting up of a joint technical committee to study Sabah's proposal for increased annual grants in addition to a counteroffer from the Federal Government. Meanwhile, the law came into force on 11 February 2022.

On 15 February 2022, days after the amendments came into force, the Sarawak State Legislative Assembly passed amendments to its state constitution that restyled the state's head of government from Chief Minister to Premier. Sarawak state Minister of Youth, Sports and Entrepreneur Development Dato Sri Abdul Karim Rahman Hamzah who tabled the bill said that the change was intended to reflect Sarawak's status as a province of Malaysia co-equal in status to Malaya and Sabah, in line with the amendments to the federal constitution that had recently come into effect.

== See also ==
- List of amendments to the Constitution of Malaysia
