= Canada (song) =

1967 song by Bobby Gimby

"Canada" (also known as "Ca-na-da" or "The Centennial Song", French version "Une chanson du centenaire") was written by Bobby Gimby in 1967 to celebrate Canada's centennial and Expo 67, and was commissioned by the Centennial Commission (a special Federal Government agency). The song was written in both of Canada's official languages, English and French.

The song's recording was performed by the Young Canada Singers, two groups of children — one that sang the French lyrics, led by Montreal conductor Raymond Berthiaume, and another that sang in English, under conductor Laurie Bower in Toronto. The song was composed by Bobby Gimby. The song was recorded at Hallmark Recording Studios in Toronto, and the 45 rpm release was manufactured for the Centennial Commission by Quality Records Ltd. The single was the most successful single in Canada in 1967, selling a then unprecedented 270,000 copies. It was No. 1 for 2 weeks on the RPM Top 100 Singles in Canada, in April 1967.

In 1971, Gimby donated all royalties to the Boy Scouts of Canada, but the song only earned one cent per airplay, which is one of the lowest rates in the world. Since its release, the song has been recorded by over 30 different musicians.

Canadian comedian and impressionist Rich Little recorded a version of the song, also in 1967, in which he performed the lyrics while impersonating then-Prime Minister Lester B. Pearson and former Prime Minister John Diefenbaker. Little's version was released in March 1967 on the Allied Records label (AR 6350), one month after the original single.

In the Canadian/British animated television show Bob and Margaret, the Centennial Song is loudly and crudely sung by the wife of Bob's cousin while showering.

== Lyrics ==
The song is sung as a continuous round. Although both English and French versions of the lyrics were produced, they are both bilingual. In the English version, the English verse is sung first, followed by the chorus in English, and then the French verse. In the French version, the order of the verses is reversed, and the first chorus is sung in French. The second, bilingual, chorus is the same for both versions, with the exception of the last line.

English Version	French Version
(English verse): CA-NA-DA (One little two little three Canadians) We love thee (Now we are twenty million) CA-NA-DA (Four little five little six little Provinces) Proud and free (Now we are ten and the Territories sea to sea) (Chorus): North south east west There'll be happy times, Church Bells will ring, ring, ring It's the hundredth anniversary of Confederation Ev'rybody sing together! (French verse): CA-NA-DA (Un petit, deux petits, trois Canadiens) Notre pays (Maintenant, nous sommes vingt million) CA-NA-DA (Quatre petites, cinq petites, six petites provinces) Longue vie (Et nous sommes dix plus les Territoires; Longue vie) (Second Chorus): Rah! Vive le Canada! Three cheers Hip, Hip, Hooray! Le centenaire, That's the order of the day Frère Jacques Frère Jacques Merrily We Roll Along Together all the way (Repeat second chorus)	(French verse): CA-NA-DA (Un petit, deux petits, trois Canadiens) Notre pays (Maintenant, nous sommes vingt million) CA-NA-DA (Quatre petites, cinq petites, six petites provinces) Longue vie (Et nous sommes dix plus les Territoires; Longue vie) (Chorus): Nord, sud, est, ouest Ding, dong, ding Allons Canadiens, très unis, Le centenaire de la Confédération Les enfants du pays, ensemble! (English verse): CA-NA-DA (One little two little three Canadians) We love thee (Now we are twenty million) CA-NA-DA (Four little five little six little Provinces) Proud and free (Now we are ten and the Territories sea to sea) (Second Chorus): Rah! Vive le Canada! Three cheers Hip, Hip, Hooray! Le centenaire, That's the order of the day Frère Jacques Frère Jacques Merrily we roll along Les enfants du pays (Repeat second chorus)

== Honours ==
In recognition of writing the song, Gimby was among the first cohorts of the Order of Canada, the country's highest civilian award which was established as part of the Centennial. He was named an Officer of the Order, with "Canada" cited by title as a reason for the recognition.

== See also ==
- Canadian patriotic music
- "A Place to Stand, A Place to Grow"
