= Sabah Day =

National holiday in Sabah

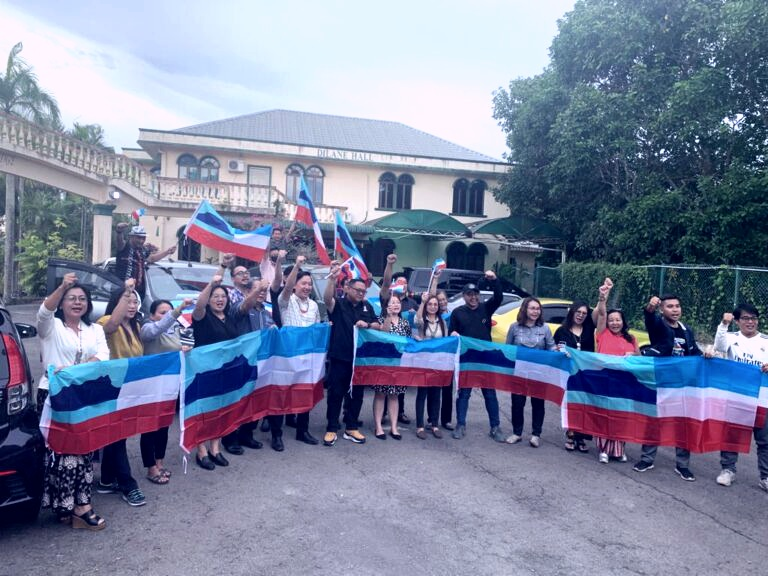
- The celebration in 2022 with the waving of the current flag of Sabah.
- Observed by: Sabah
- Type: State
- Significance: Marks the establishment of the de facto self-government in North Borneo
- Date: 31 August
- Next time: 31 August 2025
- Frequency: annual

The first flag of Sabah after achieving a self-government on 31 August 1963.

Sabah Day (Malay: Hari Sabah) is a self-government day celebrated on 31 August every year by the state of Sabah in Malaysia. Since 2012, the holiday has been received widely by the Sabah state government and the citizens of Sabah, and officially gazetted as an official state celebration in 2024.

Sabah Day was celebrated for the first time since 2023 and beyond alongside the Malayan Independence Day, after the state government approved the proposal to gazette 31 August as "Sabah Day" in 2021.

== Background ==
After the end of the World War II, the territory was administered by the British Military Administration which later transferred to the Crown Colony government in 1946 as the British North Borneo Chartered Company facing a difficulties due to the high cost to reconstructing North Borneo. The task to reconstructing the territory was later taken by the Crown colony government with the first Crown Colony Governor appointed was Edward Twining on 5 May 1949. Ralph Hone succeeded him to continue the reconstruction of the territory and later Roland Turnbull until the last Crown Colony governor of William Goode. After all the reconstruction projects been completed, the Crown Colony government later decided to grant a self-government to the territory on 31 August 1963, which is 16 days before the establishment of the Federation of Malaysia on 16 September 1963.

While North Borneo Self-government Day is often referred to as 'Sabah Independence Day', this is strictly speaking incorrect, since British legislation on North Borneo's self-government did not provide for its independence prior to it joining to form the federation of Malaysia. In 2018, the Borneo Heritage Foundation (BHF) has called the state government to gazette the day as "Sabah Day" and declare it as a state holiday.

== Celebration and theme ==
By 2023, the celebration is to be held annually. The Sabah Day are celebrated, after the National Day event. One of 25 districts in Sabah chosen as host for the celebration and will rotated among these districts every year.

== Relationship with Independence Day ==
North Borneo Self-government Day, 31 August, also happens to be Independence Day (Malay: Hari Merdeka), a national day of Malaysia commemorating the independence of the Federation of Malaya from British colonial rule in 1957. The Borneo Heritage Foundation (BHF) and Sabah's Democratic Action Party (DAP) have stated that they will be celebrating 'Sabah Independence Day' instead of Hari Merdeka on that day.

Starting from 2015, as was stated by the Minister of Communication and Multimedia Ahmad Shabery Cheek, the Independence Day celebration is likely to be held without mentioning the number of years to prevent the people in Sabah and Sarawak from being isolated if the number of independence anniversaries was stated. However, the Minister of Land Development of Sarawak Tan Sri Datuk Amar Dr James Masing reminded that since 16 September had been declared as Malaysia Day, it should be the rallying point for the nation's unity. He added "Everyone now knows that 31 August is Malaya's and Sabah's Independence Day... it's not our (Sarawak) independence day. They can celebrate it both in Malaya and in Sabah as they have the same Independence Day date, and we can join them there if they invite us. We must right the wrong". Masing was commenting on Shabery Cheek's recent proposal that Malaysia should continue to commemorate 31 August as its Independence Day, without mentioning the anniversary year.

== See also ==
- Independence Day (Malaysia)
- Sarawak Day
- Malaysia Day
