= Sarawak Day =

National holiday in Sarawak

- Official name: Sarawak Independence Day
- Observed by: Sarawak
- Type: Statewide in Sarawak
- Significance: Marks the de facto self-government of Sarawak from Britain
- Date: 22 July
- Next time: 22 July 2027
- Frequency: Annual

The flag of the Raj of Sarawak used as the first flag of Sarawak after achieving de facto self-government on 22 July 1963.

Sarawak Day (Malay: Hari Sarawak), officially known as Sarawak Independence Day (Malay: Hari Kemerdekaan Sarawak) is a holiday celebrated on 22 July annually by Sarawak, celebrating the establishment of de facto self-government on 22 July 1963.

The official Sarawak Independence Day public holiday was gazetted by the government of Sarawak in 2016 to raise awareness about Sarawak's past and contributions of its past leaders. Despite this official name, there are those who still avoided using this title, calling it the informal "Sarawak Day" instead, due to lack of awareness of its legality ("Sarawak Independence Day" is in fact the official government gazetted name), while some still argue about its historical accuracy, citing British legislation did not provide for an official, full independence. Nonetheless, there was indeed a degree of de facto independence in the form of self-government ahead of it taking part in the founding of a new federation in the form of Malaysia with other partners.

The idea of a Sarawakian holiday was mooted by the Sarawak state government and citizens since 2012, after public discontent about the public holiday Hari Merdeka being too Malaya-centric. The day was officially named Sarawak Independence Day and declared as a public holiday for the first time in 2016. Although there have been persistent attempts to falsify the historical record for political purposes, it is incontrovertible that Sarawak as a British crown colony achieved independence on 16 September 1963 as a member state of the Malaysian Federation under the Malaysia legislation passed by the sovereign United Kingdom and Malayan Parliaments in July 1963.

== Background ==
The Sultanate of Brunei granted the Raj of Sarawak to rule of the Brooke Dynasty in 1841, Sarawak was subsequently recognised as a sovereign nation by the United States (1850) and Great Britain (1864), and it voluntarily became a British protectorate (military protection) in 1888. After the end of World War II, the territory was briefly administered by the British Military Administration, then became a Crown Colony in 1946 when it was ceded to British Government by Charles Vyner Brooke. The transferring of the territory to colonial administration had led to major protests by Sarawakian citizens who wanted the independence of Sarawak to be restored. This led to the assassination of Duncan Stewart, the second governor of the Colony, by Rosli Dhobi, who was captured and subsequently hanged for murder. The position of the Governor was succeeded by Anthony Abell, who also became one of the members for the Cobbold Commission which brought Sarawak and North Borneo to the formation of the Federation of Malaysia.

Sarawak was granted self-rule on 22 July 1963, on the expectation that it would jointly form the Federation of Malaysia on 16 September the same year. It is said that before the ceremony on 22 July 1963, Alexander Waddell, the last Governor of the Colony, left the Astana and boarded a white sampan to cross the Sarawak River, then handed the administration of Sarawak to the Sarawakian citizens, with the colonial Union Jack flag lowered for the last time, and the Sarawak flag raised. Some historians dispute the significance of that event and whether it was tantamount to a granting of full independence. However, on the same day, the outgoing Governor did indeed proclaim the appointment of Stephen Kalong Ningkan as the first Chief Minister of Sarawak as well as the appointment of new Supreme Council members who formed the government's first ministerial Cabinet of Sarawak.

In 2016, the Sarawak Government under Chief Minister Adenan Satem officially gazetted 22 July as a Sarawak public holiday and that it henceforth be known as "Sarawak Independence Day".

Michael Leigh, an academic researching on the history of Sarawak, mentioned that Sarawak was "self-governed", but not "independent" on that day because although the British Governor was obliged to accept the advice from the newly formed Sarawak Cabinet, the Governor retained its full authority until the formation of Malaysia on 16 September.

== Gallery ==
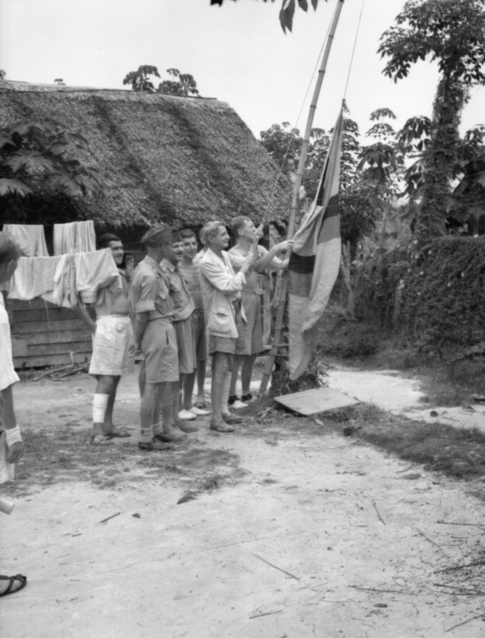
The hoisting of the Raj of Sarawak flag on the civilian compound of the Kuching POW and internment camp on 12 September 1945 by Mr. D. R. Lascelles, the former District Officer for Miri and Mr J. B. Archer, the Chief of Section of Sarawak Civil Service, ex-internees of the Japanese shortly after the surrender of Japan.

== See also ==
- Sabah Day
- Malaysia Day
