= Independence Day (Malaysia) =

Public holiday on 31 August

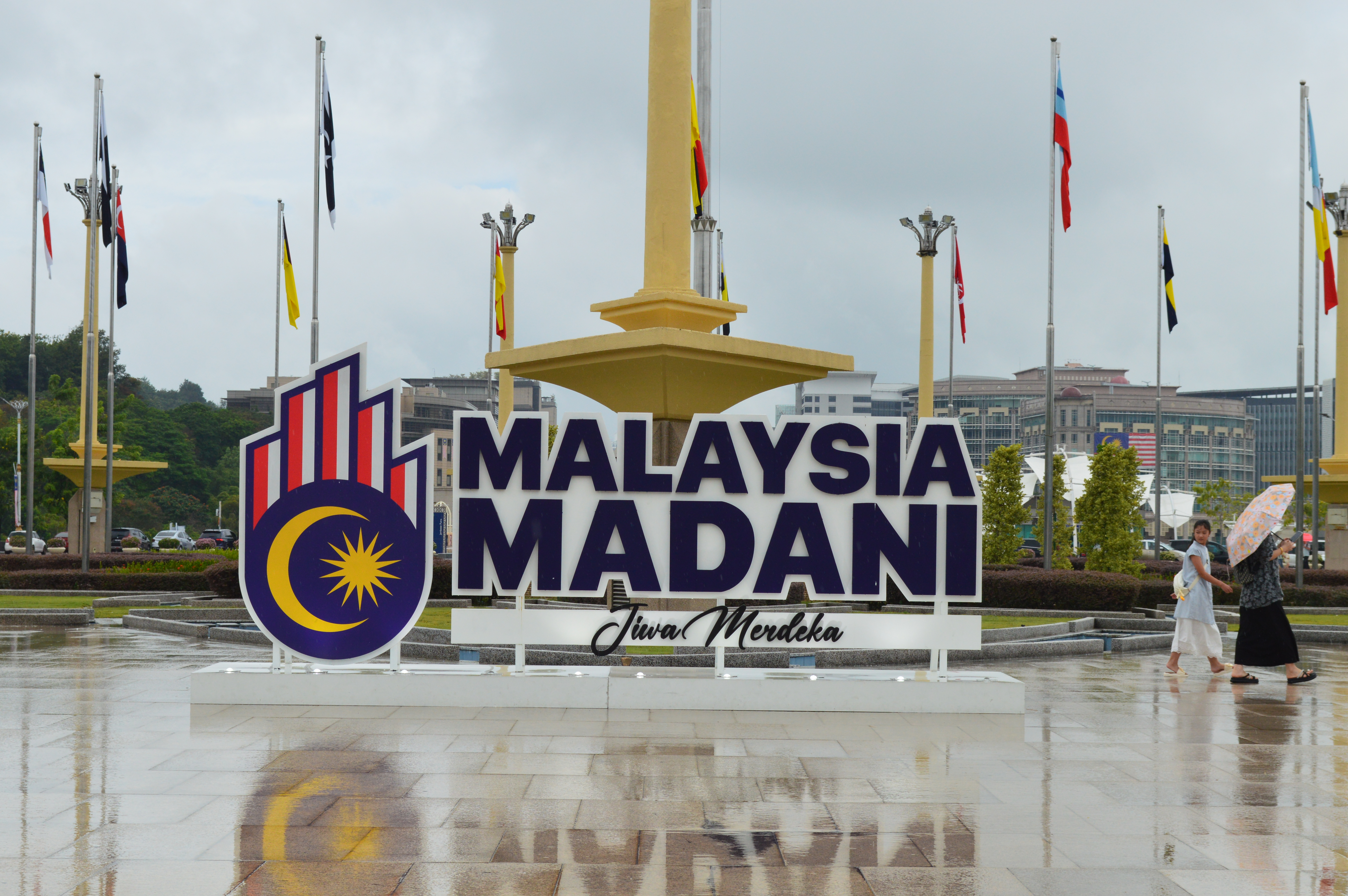
- National Day 2024 themed signage at Dataran Putra, Putrajaya.
- Official name: Hari Merdeka or Hari Kemerdekaan
- Also called: National Day (Hari Kebangsaan)
- Observed by: Malaysians
- Type: National
- Significance: Marks the independence of the Federation of Malaya
- Celebrations: Malaysian Independence Day parade
- Date: 31 August
- Next time: 31 August 2027
- Frequency: Annual

Independence Day (Malay: Hari Merdeka), also known as National Day (Malay: Hari Kebangsaan), is the independence day of the Federation of Malaya from the United Kingdom. It commemorates the Malayan Declaration of Independence of 31 August 1957, and is defined in article 160 of the Constitution of Malaysia. The day is marked by official and unofficial ceremonies and observances across the country.

The observation of 31 August as Malaysia's national day is the cause of some controversy, especially among East Malaysians, with calls to prioritise the celebration of Malaysia Day (Hari Malaysia) on 16 September instead. Malaysia Day commemorates the formation of Malaysia in 1963, when the four entities of North Borneo, Sarawak, Singapore and Malaya federated to form Malaysia as part of the Malaysia Agreement.

East Malaysians argue that it is illogical to celebrate 31 August 1957 as Malaysia's national day when Malaysia was only established in 1963, and that the "Federation of Malaya" was a different entity. Supporters of Hari Merdeka argue that "the Federation" as defined in article 160 of the Malaysian constitution is the same "Federation of Malaya" that was first established in 1948 and when it ceased to be a British protectorate on 31 August 1957.

== Events leading up to independence ==
The effort for independence was spearheaded by Tunku Abdul Rahman Putra Al-Haj, the first Prime Minister of Malaysia. When Tunku was elected as president of the United Malays National Organization (UMNO) shortly after the resignation of Tun Dato' Onn Jaafar, he soon realised that in order to save his country from a communist attack or British exploitation, he needed to fight for independence through a multi-racial alliance. Soon, he led a delegation of ministers and political leaders of Malaya in negotiations with the British in London for Merdeka, or independence along with Tun Dato Sri Tan Cheng Lock, the first president of the Malayan Chinese Association (MCA), and Tun V. T. Sambanthan, fifth President of Malayan Indian Congress. Once unity between Malay, Indian, and Chinese peoples was achieved, an agreement was reached on 8 February 1956 in Lancaster House in London, for Malaya to gain independence from the British Empire. However, logistical and administrative reasons led to the official proclamation of independence in the next year, on 31 August 1957, at Stadium Merdeka (Independence Stadium), in Kuala Lumpur, which was purposely built for the celebrations of the national independence day. The announcement of the day was set months earlier by Tunku Abdul Rahman in a meeting of the Alliance in Malacca in February 1957.

== Independence Day (31 August 1957) ==
On the night of 30 August 1957, more than 20,000 people gathered at Merdeka Square (Dataran Merdeka) in Kuala Lumpur to witness the handover of power from the British. Prime Minister-designate Tunku Abdul Rahman Putra Al-Haj arrived at 11:58 p.m. and joined members of the Alliance Party's youth divisions in observing two minutes of darkness. On the stroke of midnight, the lights were switched back on, and the Union Flag in the square was lowered as the royal anthem God Save the Queen played. The new Flag of Malaya was raised as the national anthem Negaraku was played. This was followed by seven chants of "Merdeka" by the crowd. Tunku Abdul Rahman later gave a speech hailing the ceremony as the "greatest moment in the life of the Malayan people". Before giving the address to the crowd, he was given a necklace by representatives of the Alliance Party youth in honour of this great occasion in history, with a map of Malaya inscribed on it. The event ended at one in the morning.

On the morning of 31 August 1957, the festivities moved to the newly completed Merdeka Stadium. More than 20,000 people witnessed the ceremony, which began at 9:30 am. Those in attendance included rulers of the Malay states, foreign dignitaries, members of the federal cabinet, and citizens. The Queen's representative, the Duke of Gloucester presented Tunku Abdul Rahman with the instrument of independence. Tunku then proceeded to read the Proclamation of Independence, which culminated in the chanting of "Merdeka!" seven times with the crowd joining in. The ceremony continued with the raising of the National Flag of Malaya accompanied by the national anthem being played by a military band and a 21-gun salute, followed by an azan call and a thanksgiving prayer in honour of this great occasion.

The day followed with the solemn installation of the first Yang di-Pertuan Agong, Tuanku Abdul Rahman of Negeri Sembilan, at Jalan Ampang, and the first installation banquet in his honour in the evening followed by a beating retreat performance and a fireworks display. Sports events and other events marked the birth of the new nation.

=== Attendees ===
The foreign guests of honour included:

Members of royal families

- The King and Queen of Thailand
- The Crown Prince and Princess of Japan
- The Duke and Duchess of Gloucester (representing The Queen)
- Prince William of Gloucester

Heads of government

- The Prime Minister of South Africa, Johannes Gerhardus Strijdom
- The Prime Minister of India, Jawaharlal Nehru
- The Prime Minister of Pakistan, Huseyn Shaheed Suhrawardy
- The Prime Minister of North Vietnam, Phạm Văn Đồng
- The Prime Minister of Ceylon, Solomon Bandaranaike
- The Prime Minister of Burma, U Nu
- The Prime Minister of Cambodia, Sim Var
- The United States Secretary of State, John Foster Dulles (representing U.S. president Dwight D. Eisenhower)
- The President of the Republic of Taiwan Provisional Government, Thomas Liao

Representatives from other British colonies

- The Governor of Hong Kong, Sir Alexander Grantham
- The Chief Minister of Singapore, Lim Yew Hock

Members of the former British colonial administration

- Sir Gerald Templer (former British High Commissioner in Malaya) and Lady Templer
- Lady Gurney (wife of former British High Commissioner in Malaya Sir Henry Gurney)
- Lady Gent (wife of former British High Commissioner in Malaya Sir Edward Gent)

High Commissioners of other Commonwealth countries

- High Commissioner of Canada to Malaya, Arthur Redpath Menzies
- High Commissioner of Australia to Malaya, Tom Critchley
- High Commissioner of New Zealand to Malaya, Foss Shanahan

== The formation of Malaysia ==
The Federation of Malaysia, comprising the states of the Federation of Malaya, North Borneo, Sarawak and Singapore, was officially declared on 31 August 1963, on the sixth anniversary of Malayan independence. However, the declaration was postponed to 16 September 1963, mainly due to opposition from Indonesia and the Philippines. Nevertheless, North Borneo and Singapore declared sovereignty on 31 August 1963. Indonesian opposition later escalated into a military conflict. Indonesia viewed Malaysia as a new form of colonisation over Sarawak and North Borneo, both of which bordered Indonesian territory on Borneo, although it did not lay claim to the territories. In contrast, the Philippines claimed the eastern part of Sabah.

To assure Indonesia that Malaysia was not a form of neocolonialism, the United Nations (UN) conducted a general survey rather than a referendum, involving interviews with approximately 4,000 people and receiving 2,200 memorandums from groups and private individuals. The Cobbold Commission, led by Cameron Cobbold, 1st Baron Cobbold, was also established to determine whether the people of North Borneo and Sarawak wished to join Malaysia. The Commission's eventual findings indicated substantial support for the formation of Malaysia among the peoples of Sabah and Sarawak as equal partners, paving the way for the final proclamation of Malaysia.

=== Malaysia Day ===
The formation of the Federation of Malaysia was announced on 16 September 1963, the anniversary of which is celebrated as Malaysia Day. Hari Merdeka continued to be celebrated on 31 August, the original independence date of Malaya, while Malaysia Day became a public holiday only in East Malaysia. This caused discontent among East Malaysians in particular, with some feeling that celebrating the national day on 31 August is Malaya–centric and overlooks East Malaysia's role in the formation of the country.

In 2009, it was decided that starting in 2010, Malaysia Day would be a nationwide public holiday in addition to Hari Merdeka on 31 August.

== Themes ==
Year	Theme
1970	Muhibah dan Perpaduan (Goodwill and Unity)
1971	Masyarakat Progresif (Progressive Society)
1972	Masyarakat Adil (Fair Society)
1973	Masyarakat Berkebudayaan Malaysia (A Society with Malaysian Culture)
1974	Sains dan Teknologi Alat Perpaduan (Science and Technology as Tools of Unity)
1975	Masyarakat Berdikari (A Self-Reliant Society)
1976	Ketahanan Rakyat (Strength of the People)
1977	20 Tahun Bersatu Maju (20 Years United and Progressive)
1978	Kebudayaan Sendi Perpaduan (Culture is the Core of Unity)
1979	Bersatu Berdisplin (United and Disciplined)
1980	Berdisplin Berbakti (Discipline and Service)
1981	Berdisplin Berharmoni (Discipline and Harmony)
1982	Berdisplin Giat Maju (Discipline Creates Progress)
1983	Bersama Ke Arah Kemajuan (Together Towards Success)
1984	Amanah Asas Kejayaan (Honesty Brings Success)
1985	Nasionalisme Teras Perpaduan (Nationalism is the Core of Unity)
1986	Bangsa Tegas Negara Teguh (Steadfast Society, Strong Country)
1987	Setia Bersatu Berusaha Maju (Loyally United, Progressively Striving)
1988–1989	Bersatu (United)
1990	Berjaya (Successful)
1991	Wawasan 2020 (Vision 2020)
1992	Wawasan Asas Kemajuan (Vision is the Basis of Progress)
1993	Bersatu Menuju Wawasan (Together Towards Vision)
1994	Nilai Murni Jayakan Wawasan (Good Values Makes the Vision a Success)
1995	Jatidiri Pengerak Wawasan (Steadfastness Moves the Vision Forward)
1996	Budaya Penantu Kecapaian (Culture Determines Achievements)
1997	Akhlak Mulia Masyarakat Jaya (Good Values Make a Successful Society)
1998	Negara Kita, Tanggungjawab Kita (Our Country, Our Responsibility)
1999	Bersatu Ke Alaf Baru (Together Towards the New Millennium)
2000–2005	Keranamu Malaysia (Because of you, Malaysia)
2006	Keranamu Malaysia: Misi Nasional, Penjaya Wawasan (Because of you, Malaysia: National Mission, Visionary Generator)
2007	Malaysiaku Gemilang (My Glorious Malaysia)
2008	Perpaduan Teras Kejayaan (Unity Is The Core of Success)
2009	1 Malaysia: Rakyat Didahulukan, Pencapaian Diutamakan (1 Malaysia: People First, Performance Now)
2010	1 Malaysia: Menjana Transformasi (1 Malaysia: Transforming the Nation)
2011	1 Malaysia: Transformasi Berjaya, Rakyat Sejahtera (1 Malaysia: Successful Transformations, Prosperous Citizens)
2012	55 Tahun Merdeka: Janji Ditepati (55 Years of Independence: Promises Fulfilled)
2013	Malaysiaku Berdaulat, Tanah Tumpahnya Darahku (My Sovereign Malaysia, The Land Where My Blood Has Spilt)
2014	Malaysia, Di Sini Lahirnya Sebuah Cinta (Malaysia, Here Is Where Love Begins)
2015–2016	Malaysia, Sehati Sejiwa (United, Unified Malaysia)
2017	Negaraku Sehati Sejiwa (My Country, United and Unified)
2018	Sayangi Malaysiaku (Love My Malaysia)
2019	Sayangi Malaysiaku: Malaysia Bersih (Love My Malaysia: A Clean Malaysia)
2020–2021	Malaysia Prihatin (Concerned Malaysia)
2022	Keluarga Malaysia Teguh Bersama (Malaysian Family: Stronger Together)
2023	Malaysia MADANI: Tekad Perpaduan Penuhi Harapan (Civilised Malaysia: Determination of Unity, Fulfilling Hope)
2024	Malaysia MADANI: Jiwa Merdeka (Civilised Malaysia: Independent Soul)
2025	Malaysia MADANI: Rakyat Disantuni (Civilised Malaysia: The People Are Respected)
2026	Malaysia MADANI: Kesejahteraan Dinikmati (Civilised Malaysia: Shared Prosperity)

=== Reception ===
The 2012 theme proved to be controversial, as it was seen by many Malaysians to be a political slogan rather than a patriotic one (Janji Ditepati, which meant "Promises Fulfilled", was Mohammad Najib Abdul Razak's campaign jingle in the run-up to the 2013 elections). The official "logo" was also ridiculed for its unconventional design. A video of the theme song uploaded on YouTube (with lyrics penned by Rais Yatim) garnered an overwhelming number of "dislikes" because of its overtly political content, which had nothing to do with the spirit of independence. The video has since been taken down.

The 2020 Malaysia Prihatin theme had been chosen because of the COVID-19 pandemic and in recognition of the caring and concerned of all Malaysian. In 2021, despite the theme and logo remained the same, but the theme song changed from Malaysia Prihatin (sung by Aliff Satar, Syamel, Siti Sarah, and Aina Abdul for original version, and Ernie Zakri for symphony version) to Menang Bersama (sung by Faizal Tahir), symbolizing the National Recovery Plan (Pelan Pemulihan Negara) theme, Malaysia Menang Bersama (English: Malaysia Winning Together).

2022 marks the first parade to be held after 2 years of hiatus caused by the pandemic, which was themed Keluarga Malaysia Teguh Bersama. A number of nearly 20,000 participants of various contingents involved in the parade. In 2023, the theme for Malaysia's Independence Day is 'Malaysia Madani: Determination in Unity, Fulfilling Hope'. The theme was selected to strengthen the spirit of unity and to achieve the shared aspirations for a stronger Malaysia by government of Anwar Ibrahim.

== 2015 Hari Merdeka Anniversary Issues ==
Legally, Hari Merdeka is the official independence day of 'the federation' as defined in the Article 160 of the Constitution of Malaysia, which was that established under the Federation of Malaya Agreement 1957. However, beginning in 2015, in a policy announced by the then Minister of Communication and Multimedia Ahmad Shabery Cheek, Hari Merdeka celebrations are to be held without mentioning the number of years since independence. This is to be more inclusive of Sabah and Sarawak, who left British rule in a different year.

The Minister of Land Development of Sarawak, the late James Jemut Masing, responded to this announcement by stating that Malaysia Day on 16 September should be the rallying point for the nation's unity, rather than Hari Merdeka. He added "Everyone now knows that 31 August is Malaya's and Sabah's Independence Day… it's not our (Sarawak) independence day. They can celebrate it both in Malaya and in Sabah as they have the same Independence Day date, and we can join them there if they invite us. We must right the wrong".

Before 16 September, there was no Malaysia. Let everyone remember that. It's on 16 September that the four independent countries namely Malaya, Singapore, Sarawak and North Borneo agreed to form Malaysia. And as everyone also knows, Singapore expelled by Malaysia in 1965.

— James Masing

== See also ==
- Malaysian Independence Day parade
- North Borneo Self-government Day
- Sarawak Self-government Day
- Malaysia Day
- Merdeka Maybank Tower
