= List of amendments to the Constitution of Malaysia =

As of February 2023, there have been 61 amendments to the Constitution of Malaysia since it was first enacted in 1957. The provision to amend the Constitution falls under Article 159. The constitution can be altered through an amendment Act supported by two-thirds of the members of Parliament.

== List ==
#	Amendments	Amending law/authority and short title	In force from
1st	Amend article 34	Ord. 42/1958; Constitution (Temporary Amendment) Ordinance 1958	05-12-1958
2nd	Amend articles 15, 16, 17, 23, 30, 34, 42, 43, 48, 56, 57, 61, 76, 114, 119, 122, 125, 132, 135, 137, 138, 139, 140, 141, 142, 144, 145, 148, 149, 150, 151, 154, 174; Insert articles 43A, 95A; Amend schedule 2	Act 10/1960; Constitution (Amendment) Act 1960	31-05-1960 except s.13 and para.17(d): 31-08-1957; s.31: 08-08-1960; s.3: 11-09-1960; s.2, 33 and 35: 01-12-1960; s.22, 24 and para. 27(a) and (c):01-04-1961; s.26: 16-09-1963
3rd	Amend articles 14, 15, 18, 19, 23, 24, 25, 26, 35, 39, 46, 62, 65, 67, 76, 99, 108, 110, 113, 114, 115, 116, 117, 125, 132, 148, 155, 159, 160; Insert articles 15A, 26A, 26B; Remove articles 17, 20, 21; Amend schedules 1, 2, 8, 10, 11, 13	Act 14/1962; Constitution (Amendment) Act 1962	s.8, 13, 24 and 30: 31-08-1957; s.32 (para.14 of Schedule:01-12-1960; s.12, 14, 15, 17 to 23, 28, 29 and 34, s.32 (subsubpara.(c) of para.1 of Schedule and para.4 to para.11 of Schedule) : 21-06-1962; s.16, 25 and 33: 15-07-1962; s.2, 3, 4, 6, 9, 10, 11, 26 and 27, s.32 (para.3 and 12 of Schedule): 01-10-1962; s.5, s.32 (subsubpara.(a) and (b) of para.1 of Schedule): 01-07-1963; s.7, s.32 (para.2 of Schedule): 01-02-1964; s.32 (para.13 of Schedule): 16-09-1963
4th	Amend articles 12, 16, 18, 50, 71, 74, 109, 118, 131, 139, 144, 159, 160, 161, 162, 166, 167; Remove articles 163, 164, 165, 168, 170, 171, 172, 173; Amend schedules 3, 7, 9, 10, 11; Remove schedule 12	Act 25/1963; Constitution (Amendment) Act 1963	29-08-1963 except s.2 and 5: 31-08-1957; s.7: 01-01-1958
5th	Amend articles 1, 3, 4, 5, 6, 8, 9, 10, 14, 15, 16, 18, 19, 20, 22, 24, 25, 26A, 28, 30, 31, 37, 38, 42, 45, 46, 48, 53, 54, 65, 71, 76, 80, 87, 88, 89, 91, 92, 94, 95A, 105, 113, 114, 115, 116, 118, 121, 122, 123, 124, 125, 126, 127, 128, 130, 131, 132, 135, 137, 138, 139, 140, 142, 143, 144, 145, 148, 150, 151, 152, 158, 159, 160, 161, 169; Insert articles 16A, 19A, 28A, 30A, 30B, 76A, 95B, 95C, 95D, 95E, 112A, 112B, 112C, 112D, 112E, 122A, 122B, 122C, 131A, 146A, 146B, 146C, 146D, 159A, 161A, 161B, 161C, 161D, 161E, 161F, 161G, 161H; Remove articles 21, 129, 174; Amend schedules 2, 4, 5, 6, 8, 9, 10, 11, 13	Act 26/1963; Malaysia Act	16-09-1963 except s.37: 31-08-1957
5th	When Sabah, Sarawak and Singapore joined Malaya to form Malaysia in 1963, the Malaysia Act was passed in Parliament to amend the Constitution to provide for the name change and the inclusion of the three new states.		
6th	Amend articles 9, 26, 35, 45, 57, 62, 160; Insert articles 43B, 43C; Amend schedule 8	Act 19/1964; Constitution (Amendment) Act 1964	30-07-1964 except s.5: 16-09-1963; s.4: 01-01-1965
7th	Amend articles 54, 95C, 120, 122, 132, 146A, 160; Insert article 118A; Amend schedules 7, 8, 9, 11	Act 31/1965; Constitution and Malaysia Act (Amendment) Act 1965	01-07-1965 except Part I of First Schedule and Second Schedule: 16-09-1963; Part II of First Schedule–amendment of Article 132 of the Constitution–Malacca: 01-05-1960; and Penang: 01-11-1959
8th		Act 53/1965; Constitution and Malaysia (Singapore Amendment) Act 1965	09-08-1965
8th	Agreement relating to the separation of Singapore from Malaysia as an independent and sovereign state		
9th	Amend articles 1, 3, 9, 14, 15, 16, 16A, 18, 19, 26A, 28A, 30, 42, 46, 54, 55, 71, 88, 95B, 95D, 95E, 112A, 112B, 113, 121, 122A, 122B, 125, 139, 144, 146A, 146B, 146C, 148, 159, 159A, 160, 169; Remove articles 19A, 30A, 30B, 112E, 116F, 116G, 116H; Amend schedules 2, 8, 9, 10	Act 59/1966; Constitution (Amendment) Act 1966	19-09-1966 except Schedule (amendments of Articles 1, 3, 14, 15, 16, 16A, 18, 19, 19A, 26A, 28A, 30, 30A, 30B, 42, 46, 88, 95B, 95D, 95E, 112A, 112B, 112E, 113, 121, 122A, 122B, 146B, 146C(1), 159, 160, 161F-161H, 169, Second Schedule, Eighth Schedule (s.23) and Ninth Schedule: 09-08-1965; Schedule (amendments of Article 71): 16-09-1963; Schedule (amendments of Tenth Schedule: 01-01-1963)
10th	Amend article 150	Act 68/1966; Emergency (Federal Constitution and Constitution of Sarawak) Act 1966	20-09-1966
11th	Amend articles 135, 139; Amend schedule 8	Act 27/1968; Constitution (Amendment) Act 1968	09-09-1968
12th	Amend article 54; Amend schedules 8, 13	Act A1; Constitution (Amendment) Act 1969	18-11-1968
13th	Amend article 122A	P.U. (B) 83/1969; Resolution pursuant to Article 122A(1)	10-04-1969
14th		P.U. (A) 146/1969; Emergency (Essential Powers) Ordinance 1969	15-05-1969
15th		P.U. (A) 170/1969; Emergency (Essential Powers) Ordinance 1969	15-05-1969
16th		P.U. (A) 143/1970; Emergency (Essential Powers) Ordinance No. 32, 1970	12-05-1970
17th	Amend articles 10, 63, 72, 152, 153, 159, 161A	Act A30; Constitution (Amendment) Act 1971	10-03-1971
17th	One of the most controversial amendments in Malaysia's Constitution is the Constitution (Amendment) Act, 1971, which came in the wake of the May 13, 1969 racial riots. Known as the “Sensitive Matters Amendment,” it revised Article 10 – which safeguards freedom of speech – to empower Parliament to pass laws to restrict public discussion on four “sensitive” issues: citizenship; the national language and the languages of other communities; the special position and privileges of the Malays and natives of the Borneo states, and the legitimate interests of other communities; and the rulers’ sovereignty. Before the Act, the Conference of Rulers’ consent was required only for amendments to provisions related to the rulers, and the special rights and privileges of the Malays and the legitimate interests of other communities. As a result of the Act, consent was also required for other provisions, such as Article 10 (freedom of speech), Article 63 (privileges of Parliament), Article 72 (privileges of the state legislative assembly) and Article 152 (national language). Article 153 originally provided for the Yang di-Pertuan Agong to be the guardian of the special position of the Malays and the legitimate interests of other communities. It also empowered him to ensure that a reasonable proportion of opportunities was reserved for the Malays in public service, education, and for permits and licences. The 1971 amendment allowed the natives of the Borneo states to have the same status as the Malays. It also empowered the Agong to direct any institution of higher learning to reserve a reasonable proportion of places for the Malays and natives, should the number of places be less than the number of qualified candidates.		
18th	Amend articles 40, 43A, 43B, 54, 61, 125, 135, 137, 144, 159, 160, 162; Amend schedules 3, 5, 8	Act A31; Constitution (Amendment) (No. 2) Act 1971	24-03-1971 except s.4: 19-09-1966
19th	Amend articles 132, 135, 144; Insert article 141A; Amend schedule 8	Act A193; Constitution (Amendment) Act 1973	05-05-1973 except s.2, 3, 4 and 5: 01-01-1974
20th	Amend articles 1, 3, 11, 42, 46, 97, 113, 116; Amend schedules 9, 11	Act A206; Constitution (Amendment) (No. 2) Act 1973	Part I and Schedule: 01-02-1974; Part II and III: 23-08-1973
21st	Amend articles 25, 48; Amend schedules 2, 8	Act 160; Malaysian Currency (Ringgit) Act 1975	29-08-1975
22nd		Act A335; Constitution (Amendment) (No. 2) Act 1976	01-02-1974
23rd	Amend articles 1, 3, 5, 11, 12, 19, 24, 25, 28A, 32, 33, 34, 35, 37, 38, 42, 48, 54, 55, 65, 70, 71, 76, 88, 91, 95A, 97, 99, 100, 101, 106, 107, 108, 111, 112, 112A, 112C, 113, 114, 121, 122, 122A, 122B, 128, 132, 135, 138, 140, 141A, 144, 145, 146, 146B, 146C, 146D, 148, 150, 151, 153, 160, 161, 161A, 161B, 161E, 169; Insert articles 125A; Remove articles 146A, 161C, 161D; Amend schedules 2, 3, 4, 5, 7, 8, 9, 10	Act A354; Constitution (Amendment) Act 1976	27-08-1976 except s.48: 01-01-1976
24th	Amend schedule 10	Act A392; Capitation Grant Act 1977	01-01-1976
25th	Amend articles 45, 135, 141A, 149	Act A442; Constitution (Amendment) Act 1978	31-12-1978
26th	Amend articles 15, 16A, 28A, 38, 42, 45, 48, 52, 55, 56, 57, 70, 71, 88, 89, 95B, 95D, 95E, 112A, 112B, 112C, 112D, 114, 121, 122B, 139, 142, 143, 146D, 149, 150, 153, 161, 161A, 161B, 161E, 169; Remove articles 141, 146C, 146D; Amend schedules 2, 5, 8, 9, 10	Act A514; Capitation Grant Act 1981	15-05-1981 except s.19: 27-08-1976
27th	Amend article 122	P.U. (A) 114/1982; Constitution of the Federal Court (Judges) Order 1982	01-05-1982
28th	Amend articles 1, 37, 43A, 43B, 46, 48, 53, 56, 57, 58, 59, 66, 80, 87, 90, 105, 114, 121, 122, 122A, 122B, 122C, 123, 124, 125, 125A, 126, 127, 128, 130, 131A, 138, 142, 143, 145, 150, 151, 152, 160, 161, 161A, 161B; Remove article 131; Amend schedules 8, 9	Act A566; Constitution (Amendment) Act 1983	16-12-1983 except s.15, 16, 17: 01-01-1985; s.2: 01-02-1974
29th	Amend articles 66, 150; Amend schedule 8	Act A584; Constitution (Amendment) Act 1984	20-01-1984 except s.4: 16-12-1983
30th	Amend articles 1, 3, 11, 42, 45, 46, 54, 55, 86, 89, 97, 113, 140, 161A; Amend schedules 8, 9, 11	Act A585; Constitution (Amendment) (No. 2) Act 1984	Part III: 14-04-1984 except s.24 : 01-02-1974; Part I and Part II: 16-04-1984
31st	Amend articles 46, 61	Act A631; Constitution (Amendment) Act 1985	24-02-1986
32nd	Amend articles 5, 83, 85, 86, 118A, 121, 142, 145; Remove articles 84, 158; Amend schedule 9	Act A704; Constitution (Amendment) Act 1988	10-06-1988
32nd	1988 Malaysian constitutional crisis Another milestone in the Constitution's evolution was the amendment to Article 121 in 1988, which effectively put the judiciary under Parliament's influence. The attorney-general was also empowered to determine the courts for cases to be heard. To the legal fraternity and civil society, this eroded the judiciary's autonomy and weakened the separation of powers between the three branches of government – the judiciary, the executive and the legislature. The amendment came in the wake of a series of court cases where the executive accused the judiciary of encroaching on its powers. These cases included a court ruling overturning the government's decision to revoke a foreign correspondent's work permit, judicial reviews of ministerial decisions such as the award of the North South Highway project to UEM, and the declaration of Umno as illegal following a dispute over the party's election in 1987. Then Lord President, Tun Salleh Abas, and several judges, wrote a letter to the King about the efforts to undermine public confidence in the judiciary. He was charged with writing the letter without the approval of all the judges and displaying bias against the government, and was dismissed in August 1988. Five Supreme Court judges who objected to the tribunal set up to decide Salleh's fate were suspended. They were the late Tan Sri Wan Suleiman Pawanteh and Tan Sri Eusoffe Abdoolcader, Tan Sri Azmi Kamaruddin, Tan Sri Wan Hamzah Salleh and Datuk George Seah. After Salleh's dismissal, a second tribunal was convened to deal with the five judges, resulting in the dismissal of Wan Suleiman and Seah, while the others were acquitted. Another amendment in 1988 resulted in Article 121 (1)(A), which stipulated a separation of jurisdictions between the civil and syariah courts, whereby the former would have no say over any matter under the syariah court's purview.		
33rd	Amend articles 48, 139, 141A, 151; Amend schedule 8	Act A767; Federal Constitution (Amendment) Act 1990	11-05-1990
34th	Amend article 139	P.U. (A) 149/1990; Constitution of the Public Services Commission Order 1990	15-06-1990
35th	Amend article 141A	P.U. (A) 150/1990; Constitution of the Education Service Commission Order 1990	15-06-1990
36th	Amend articles 46, 65, 113, 132	Act A837; Constitution (Amendment) Act 1992	20-11-1992
37th	Amend schedule 10	Act 503; Capitation Grant Act 1993	01-01-1992
38th	Amend articles 32, 38, 42, 63, 72; Insert articles 33A, 181, 182, 183; Amend schedule 8	Act A848; Constitution (Amendment) Act 1993	30-03-1993
38th	More controversial were the 1993 amendments that limited the monarchy's power, stripping the nine hereditary state rulers of immunity from prosecution. This came about after an incident where the then Sultan of Johor, Iskandar of Johor allegedly assaulted a sports coach.		
39th	Amend article 113; Amend schedule 8	Act A849; Constitution (Amendment) (No. 2) Act 1993	16-07-1993 except s.2 and 4: 20-11-1992
40th	Amend articles 43, 54; Amend schedules 8, 11	Act A857; Constitution (Amendment) (No. 3) Act 1993	20-08-1993
41st	Amend articles 4, 37, 40, 43A, 55, 65, 66, 80, 87, 105, 114, 121, 122, 122A, 122B, 122C, 123, 124, 125, 125A, 126, 127, 128, 130, 131A, 132, 134, 138, 139, 142, 143, 145, 148, 151, 152, 160, 161, 161B, 161E, 182; Insert articles 122AA, 122AB; Amend schedules 6, 8, 9	Act A885; Constitution (Amendment) Act 1994	24-06-1994
42nd	Amend schedule 8	Act A919; Federal Constitution (Amendment) Act 1995	21-07-1995
43rd	Amend article 46	Act A945; Constitution (Amendment) Act 1996	07-06-1996
44th	Amend articles 1, 3, 11, 42, 45, 46, 89, 97, 113; Amend schedules 9, 11	Act A1095; Constitution (Amendment) Act 2001	01-02-2001
45th	Amend articles 8, 45, 56, 57, 65, 114, 119, 137; Insert articles 160A, 160B; Amend schedules 7, 11	Act A1130; Constitution (Amendment) (No. 2) Act 2001	28-09-2001
46th	Amend article 141A	P.U. (A) 169/2001; Constitution of the Education Service Commission Order 2001	01-03-2001
47th	Amend article 122A	P.U. (A) 378/2001; Constitution of the Court of Appeal Order 2001	01-01-2002
48th	Amend schedule 10	Act 622; Capitation Grant Act 2002	01-01-2002
49th	Amend article 46	Act A1198; Constitution (Amendment) Act 2003	15-08-2003
50th	Amend articles 122, 125; Amend schedules 9, 10	Act A1239; Constitution (Amendment) Act 2005	21-03-2005 except para.5(a): 31-01-2007
51st	Amend article 122	P.U. (A) 229/2005; Constitution of the Federal Court Order 2005	02-06-2005
52nd	Amend articles 46, 121, 124, 125	Act A1260; Constitution (Amendment) (No. 2) Act 2005	19-01-2006 except para.3(b): 10-10-2003
53rd	Amend article 122AA	P.U. (A) 384/2006; Constitution of the High Court (Judges) Order 2006	01-10-2006
54th	Amend article 122A	P.U. (A) 385/2006; Constitution of the Court of Appeal Order 2006	01-10-2006
55th	Amend article 114	Act A1320; Constitution (Amendment) Act 2007	27-12-2007
56th	Amend article 122	P.U. (A) 163/2009; Constitution of the Federal Court Order 2009	01-05-2009
57th	Amend article 122A	P.U. (A) 164/2009; Constitution of the Court of Appeal Order 2009	01-05-2009
58th	Amend article 47, 119; Amend schedules 8	Act A1603; Constitution (Amendment) Act 2019	11-09-2019 except s.3: 15-12-2021
58th	This amendment lowers the voting age from 21 to 18 and introduces automatic voter registration		
59th	Amend article 1, 160, 161A	Act A1642; Constitution (Amendment) Act 2022	11-02-2022
60th	Insert article 119A	Act A1656; Constitution (Amendment) (No. 2) Act 2022	15-12-2021
61st	Amend articles 10, 48, 160; Insert article 49A; Amend schedule 8	Act A1663; Constitution (Amendment) (No. 3) Act 2022	5-10-2022 except s.6: 08-12-2022
61st	2020–2022 Malaysian political crisis Following the political crisis that caused by frequent party switching by MPs. The Constitution (Amendment) No. 3 Act 2022 is tabled to prevent another political crisis that caused by party hopping in the future.		
