= Bobby Gimby =

Canadian musician (1918–1998)

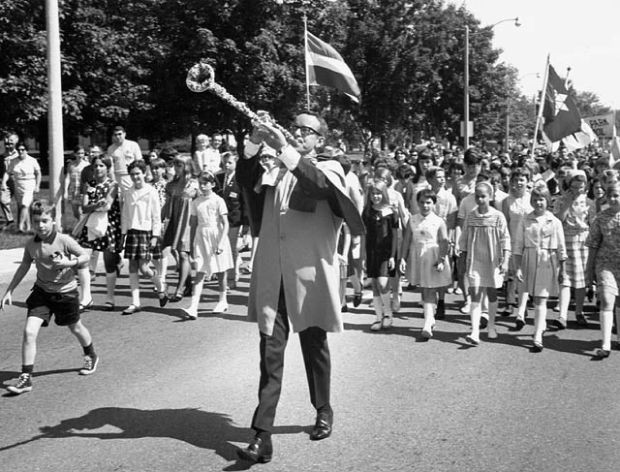
- Bobby Gimby as The Pied Piper

Background information
- Born: October 25, 1918; Cabri, Saskatchewan, Canada
- Died: June 20, 1998 (aged 79) North Bay, Ontario, Canada
- Genre: Pop
- Occupations: Musician, songwriter, bandleader
- Instrument: Trumpet

Robert Stead Gimby (October 25, 1918 – June 20, 1998) was a Canadian orchestra leader, trumpeter, and singer-songwriter.

== Biography ==
Gimby (pronounced Jim-bee) was born in Cabri, Saskatchewan, a small town of about 300 people. He came from a musical family: his father Albert S. Gimby played fiddle, his mother played piano, and his sister played guitar. His father ran a hardware store, but after it burned in a fire the family struggled financially. They left Saskatchewan to live near relatives in British Columbia. The family moved to Chilliwack, B.C., where they lived throughout the 1930s, and where Gimby attended Chilliwack High School.

In Chilliwack he was a member of the Town Band, a popular group which played at local dances. In 1941, he joined the touring orchestra of Canadian bandleader Mart Kenney. He played trumpet (the press of that time referred to him as "The Wizard of the Trumpet") and he went on the road with Mart Kenney's Western Gentlemen, working mainly in Vancouver and western Canada.

Around 1944, Gimby moved to Toronto. He founded his own band and became popular playing for teenagers. Thanks to his sponsor, the Simpson's store, he was able to entertain at various teen events during the mid-1940s. In the late 1940s, he and his band made several recordings. In 1945, he became a member of the long-running radio program the Happy Gang. He remained with the Gang for thirteen years, until April 1959. In 1949, he was given his own program on CBC Radio; his band at that time was called the Rodeo Rascals. In addition to continuing to lead his own orchestra, Gimby appeared on CBC Television in the late 1950s and hosted a show on CTV in the mid-1970s. On that show, he concentrated on big band and pop songs that would appeal to viewers who remembered him from the 1940s and 1950s.

== Later career ==
In the early 1960s, Gimby was working as a songwriter; he also worked for an advertising agency, writing jingles for commercials. In 1962, while in Singapore on business, he wrote a patriotic song about the impending independence of the country. It was called "Malaysia Forever" and it celebrated the formation of Malaysian Federation in 1963. The song became very popular, spurred by frequent radio play, and was thought of as the new country's first national anthem.

Gimby came to be known as "The Pied Piper of Canada", a role he embraced: he would perform his music dressed up in a Pied Piper costume, wearing a cape. His popularity soared after he wrote a 1967 song called "Ca-na-da," which commemorated the Canadian Centennial. He wrote the bilingual song (also known as "Canada") using children's voices to sing the chorus; wherever he performed it, he would invite local school kids up on stage to sing it with him. More than 50 recordings were made of the song, plus more than 250 Canadian school choirs and bands recorded it. The song was written for a documentary about the Centennial, but teachers loved the patriotic message of "Ca-na-da" and led the demand to release it as a single. Throughout 1967 the song remained at the top of the Canadian music charts. In 1971, Gimby donated the song's manuscript and all future royalties to Scouts Canada.

Gimby was a prolific songwriter throughout his career. In addition to his country's Centennial song, his compositions included centennial songs for the provinces of Manitoba and British Columbia. He wrote pop songs that were recorded by Peggy Lee, Georgia Gibbs, and Ray Bolger.

Gimby performed many concerts for young audiences, and was often praised for his ability to connect with kids. He often participated in events where he would lead a parade of singing children to a county fairgrounds and then perform for the fair's attendees. Gimby also traveled to military bases in foreign countries, where he would entertain the children of service personnel who were stationed overseas. In recognition of his musical contribution to his country, Gimby received the Medal of Service, and was made an Officer of the Order of Canada in 1968.

In a Wayne and Shuster skit about a mail-in record offer, the comedians offer a collection containing the entire works of "Brahms, Beethoven, Strauss, Wagner and Bobby Gimby!"

Gimby died in 1998 in a nursing home in North Bay, Ontario, at age 79. He was interred in Plot T, Lot 1933 at Mount Pleasant Cemetery, Toronto.

== See also ==
- Expo 67
