= Hasnoor Hussein =

Malaysian politician

Hasnoor Sidang Hussein is a Malaysian politician from the ruling United Malays National Organisation (UMNO). He became prominent in 2006 for his controversial remarks at the UMNO Annual General Assembly as a delegate from Malacca on the subject of racial issues. He later became the first, together with Azimi Daim and Hashim Suboh, to be officially reprimanded by UMNO for a speech made at an UMNO Annual General Assembly.

== Controversy ==
The 2006 UMNO Annual General Assembly was the first ever to be telecast live. Hasnoor was among the delegates permitted to address the assembly, and like all others, his speech was carried live. In the course of his remarks, Hasnoor stated that non-Malay citizens needed to be grateful for having been granted citizenship at independence under the Malaysian social contract. He also spoke out against the non-Malays who were critical of the special position of the Malays and other members of the bumiputra (indigenous people) ethnic majority, stating: "If they (non-Malays) question our rights, then we should question theirs. So far we have not heard the Malays questioning their right to citizenship when they came in droves from other countries."

The most controversial of his remarks, however, was his declaration that "Umno is willing to risk lives and bathe in blood to defend the race and religion (Islam, the official religion of Malaysia and of the Malays). Don't play with fire. If they (non-Malays) mess with our rights, we will mess with theirs." Hasnoor's remarks formed one third of the three disputed speeches made; another one was that by UMNO Youth Information Chief Azimi Daim, who said "when tension rises, the blood of Malay warriors will run in our veins", while the third was made by a delegate from Perak, Hashim Suboh, who referred to UMNO Youth Chief and Education Minister Hishammuddin Hussein's act of brandishing the kris (Malay dagger): "Datuk Hisham has unsheathed his keris, waved his keris, kissed his keris. We want to ask Datuk Hisham when is he going to use it." As a result of the controversy, UMNO Deputy President and Deputy Prime Minister Najib Tun Razak announced that "we are seriously looking into the wisdom of having (a) live telecast" of the proceedings.

The speeches later became the subject of a debate in Parliament. Leader of the Opposition, Lim Kit Siang from the Democratic Action Party (DAP), said that "The speeches have upset non-Malays and they are feeling insecure. It is sad that Malay leaders can still speak like this 50 years after independence. We feel excluded and threatened." He filed a motion to have the Dewan Rakyat (the lower house of Parliament) consider the subject of the speeches, but it was rejected by the Speaker. Another lawmaker from the DAP, Karpal Singh, accused Hasnoor and the other delegates of having committed sedition, which under the Sedition Act is a crime in Malaysia. Lim Keng Yaik, President of the Gerakan Rakyat Malaysia (Malaysian People's Movement), a major party in the ruling Barisan Nasional coalition government led by UMNO, also expressed worry about "where these sentiments will lead to". Najib responded that "Some inexperienced speakers got carried away," and assured them that "We reject such sentiments ... this is not official policy." He also stated that the speakers were being investigated by the Police for the crime of sedition.

Soon after, Abdullah Ahmad Badawi, President of UMNO and the Prime Minister, announced that three unidentified speakers at the assembly had been officially reprimanded for their statements. In Singapore, the Straits Times described this as "the first time that Umno has taken action based on police reports and complaints by the opposition and non-Malay communities over the years on the same issue." The following day, the UMNO-owned English daily, the New Straits Times, identified the three speakers as Hasnoor, Azimi, and Hashim. Hasnoor said he "told the party leadership that I was sorry for what I had said. It was not my intention to touch on racial sensitivities and to hurt the feelings of the other races." He also suggested that furuteUMNO assembly proceedings should not be broadcast live.

== Election results ==
Malacca State Legislative Assembly
Year	Constituency	Candidate	Votes	Pct	Opponent(s)	Votes	Pct	Ballots cast	Majority	Turnout
2021	N17 Bukit Katil	Hasnoor Sidang Husin (UMNO)	5,748	35.10%	Adly Zahari (AMANAH)	6,805	41.55%	16,377	1,057	65.14%
2021	N17 Bukit Katil	Hasnoor Sidang Husin (UMNO)	5,748	35.10%	Muhammad Al Afiz Yahya (PAS)	3,715	22.68%	16,377	1,057	65.14%
2021	N17 Bukit Katil	Hasnoor Sidang Husin (UMNO)	5,748	35.10%	Abdul Hamid Mustapah (IND)	109	0.07%	16,377	1,057	65.14%
