= Hashim Suboh =

Yang Berbahagia Datuk Hashim Suboh DMSM

Permanent Deputy Chairman of Malaysian United Indigenous Party
- In office 23 August 2020 – 11 March 2023
- Preceded by: Azimi Daim
- Succeeded by: Kamarudin Md Nor

Personal details
- Born: Hashim bin Suboh; 5 July 1959 (age 66) Perlis
- Party: BERSATU (until 2023)
- Spouse: Datin Rosita Kassim
- Children: 4

Datuk Hashim Suboh is a Malaysian politician from the Malaysian United Indigenous Party (UMNO), party of the Perikatan Nasional coalition. He is the former Deputy Chief of the party's Kangar division. Hashim made headlines in Malaysia in 2006 when he made a number of controversial remarks at the UMNO General Assembly that some labelled as seditious.

He currently is a member of Malaysian United Indigenous Party (BERSATU).

== Controversy ==
In 2005, Education Minister and UMNO Youth Chief Hishammuddin Hussein brandished a kris (Malay dagger) at the UMNO General Assembly. The kris, named Panca Warisan, made another appearance at the 2006 General Assembly. On both occasions, it had been used in the context of defending certain special privileges accorded to the Malays under the Constitution of Malaysia. These privileges, sometimes referred to as the Malay Agenda, formed half of the Malaysian social contract, which granted citizenship to non-Malay Malaysians in return for special rights for the Malays. (Such special rights feature heavily in the ideal of ketuanan Melayu or Malay supremacy, which is a feature of UMNO's ideology.)

It was after the second instance of Hishammuddin's actions that Hashim made headlines, when Hashim, speaking as a UMNO delegate from the state of Perlis, asked: "Datuk Hisham has unsheathed his keris, waved his keris, kissed his keris. We want to ask Datuk Hisham when is he going to use it?" He continued that "force must be used against those who refused to abide by the social contract", insisting that Hishammuddin be tougher in dealing with the Chinese national-type schools, which though publicly funded, are generally independent of the public national school system. Hashim's remark provoked a response from the opposition Democratic Action Party, which accused him of creating "concern and disquiet among non-Malays in the country. The statements amount to sedition as they have a seditious tendency".

The original Malay remark was: "Dalam Perhimpunan Agung Umno ini, Datuk Hishammuddin dua kali berturut-turut angkat keris. Jadi, kita nak tanya bila Datuk Hishammuddin nak bertikam pulak?" Translated literally, this would read: "At this UMNO General Assembly, Datuk Hishammuddin has twice raised the keris, So, we want to ask when Datuk Hishammuddin will stab instead?".

Hashim was later reprimanded for his statement by UMNO. He stated that he was surprised at the backlash, and that:

I used the kris as a metaphor and not in its literal meaning. I was speaking about how the Education Minister should take proactive action towards certain issues relating to schools. ... Next year, I will choose my metaphors and words more carefully. I don’t want to leave room for any misinterpretation.

== Honours ==
- Malacca
  - Companion Class I of the Exalted Order of Malacca (DMSM) – Datuk (2006)
