= Social contract (Malaysia) =

Political construct justifying preferential policies

The social contract in Malaysia is a political construct first brought up in the 1980s, allegedly to justify the continuation of the discriminatory preferential policies for the majority Bumiputera (Note: In Malaysia, the term "Bumiputera" refers to the Malays, the Orang Asli of Peninsular Malaysia (lit. "indigenous people") and the various indigenous peoples of Borneo, an island politically divided between Brunei, Indonesia and Malaysia.) at the expense of the non-Bumiputera, particularly the Chinese and Indian citizens of the country. Generally describing the envisaged 20-year initial duration of the Malaysian New Economic Policy, proponents of the construct allege that it reflects an "understanding" arrived at – prior to Malaya's independence in 1957 – by the country's "founding fathers", which is an ill-defined term generally taken to encompass Tunku Abdul Rahman, Malaysia's first Prime Minister, as well as V. T. Sambanthan and Tan Cheng Lock, who were the key leaders of political parties representing the Malay, Indian and Chinese populations respectively in pre-independence Malaya.

The "social contract" retrospectively creates the notion of a trade-off between the majority and minority ethnic populations of Malaysia. Under this notion, Articles 14–18 of the Constitution of Malaysia, which provided a pathway to citizenship for Chinese, Indians and other minorities in 1957, were enacted "in exchange for" Article 153 of the same Constitution, which preserves certain quotas and other rights for the majority Bumiputera population. Proponents of the Malaysian social contract claim that this was both a quid pro quo and a condition precedent for the granting of citizenship to the non-Bumiputera populations of Malaya in 1957, particularly the Chinese and the Indians.

As has been pointed out by numerous academics and scholars, however, the idea of a quid pro quo for citizenship does not appear anywhere in the detailed report or deliberations of the Reid Commission, the independent commission responsible for drafting the Constitution. Nor can any reference to such a trade-off be found in the contemporary statements or writings of the "founding fathers". Deemed as a fabrication, the term "social contract" in the Malaysian context was, in fact, first used by the United Malays National Organisation (UMNO) politician Abdullah Ahmad in 1986 in a political speech he delivered during his visit to Singapore.

The concept of a social contract is well-established in Western political philosophy and dates from the Age of Enlightenment. Its Malaysian counterpart is controversial because it has been perceived by some as a propaganda device with no historical basis. In its typical context related to race relations, the Malaysian social contract has been heavily criticised by many, including some politicians from the Barisan Nasional (BN) coalition, who contend that constant harping on the non-Malays' debt to the Malays for citizenship has alienated them from the country. Such criticisms have met with opposition from some sectors of the Malay media and UMNO, the largest political party in the BN. In addition to this, even academic scholars have doubted the authenticity of the notion of this contract as the contract itself is not mentioned in said constitution; economist and academician Ungku Abdul Aziz claimed it to be "a fantasy made up by politicians according to their interests".

== Alleged scope of the "social contract" ==
Its defenders often refer to the Constitution as setting out the social contract, and the Malaysian founding fathers having agreed to it, although no reference to a "social contract" appears in the Constitution, nor has any document ever fully set out the social contract's terms. Instead, the social contract is merely asserted to represent a permanent agreement regarding the "special position of the Malays" by the non-Malay population, as the historical and unquestionable price paid in exchange for full citizenship. The idea of the Malaysian social contract has permeated the country's political discourse and even educational materials. A higher education Malaysian studies textbook conforming to the government syllabus states: "Since the Malay leaders agreed to relax the conditions for citizenship, the leaders of the Chinese and Indian communities accepted the special position of the Malays as indigenous people of Malaya. With the establishment of Malaysia, the special position status was extended to include the indigenous communities of Sabah and Sarawak."

Another description of the social contract narrows it down to the Malays and Chinese only, in which "Malay entitlement to political and administrative authority should be accepted unchallenged, at least for the time being, in return for non-interference in Chinese control of the economy".

The Constitution explicitly grants the Bumiputra reservations of land, quotas in the civil service, public scholarships and public education, quotas for trade licences, and the permission to monopolise certain industries if the government permits. In reality, however, especially after the advent of the Malaysian New Economic Policy (NEP) due to the racial riots of the May 13 Incident which occurred in 1969 when Malays controlled only 4% of the Malaysian economy, Bumiputra privileges have extended to other areas; quotas are set for Bumiputra equity in publicly traded corporations, and discounts for them on automobiles and real estate ranging from 5% to 15% are mandated.

The Constitution also included elements of Malay tradition as part of the Malaysian national identity. The Malay rulers were preserved, with the head of state, the Yang di-Pertuan Agong, drawn from their ranks. Islam would be the national religion, and the Malay language would be the national language. These provisions, along with the economic privileges accorded by Article 153 of the Constitution, made up one half of the bargain, and have been referred to as the Malay Agenda. The nature of these provisions is disputed; although many Malays refer to them as "rights" – a term common in UMNO rhetoric – critics have argued that the Constitution never refers to special rights for the Malays

There is no such thing as a racial "right" to be given special treatment. And that is not me being argumentative, it's the Constitution. You won't find "Malay rights" in the supreme law of our land, instead, you will find terms such as "special position" of Malays. The difference is more than semantics. A right implies something inalienable. A privilege on the other hand is a benefit, presumably given to those who need it.

Such critics have used this basis to argue that the social contract was meant "to protect the Malays from being overwhelmed economically, administratively and politically from the immigrant ethnic groups of the time", instead of granting particular special rights to the Malays.

Some suggest that this bias towards Malays in education and politics is, in part, a response to the ability of the Malaysian Chinese to secure most of the country's wealth. The Indian Malaysians, as with the Indian Singaporeans, can make a case for being those that lose out the most, although this may be disputed.

The government rolled back the quota system for entry to public universities in 2003 and introduced a policy of "meritocracy". However, this new system was widely criticised by the non-Bumiputras as benefiting the Bumiputras by streaming them into a matriculation programme that featured relatively easy coursework while the non-Bumiputras were forced to sit for the Sijil Tinggi Persekolahan Malaysia (STPM, or Malaysia Higher School Certificate). Although in theory non-Bumiputras may enter the matriculation stream, and Bumiputras may sit for the STPM, this rarely occurs. Meritocracy was also criticised by some in UMNO as being discriminatory, as it caused the rural and less-prepared Malays to fall behind in university entrance rates.

The Reid Commission which prepared the framework for the Constitution stated in its report that Article 153, the alleged backbone of the social contract, would be temporary only, and recommended that it be reviewed 15 years after independence. The Commission also said that the Article and its provisions would only be necessary to avoid sudden unfair disadvantage to the Malays in competing with other members of Malaysian society, and that the privileges accorded the Malays by the article should be gradually reduced and eventually eliminated. Due to the 13 May Incident, after which a state of emergency was declared, Article 153 was not reviewed in 1972, as recommended by the Reid Commission.

According to the social contract's proponents, in return for the enactment of these originally temporary provisions, non-Malay Malaysians are accorded citizenship under Chapter 1 of Part III of the Constitution. Except for the Bumiputra privileges, non-Bumiputras are otherwise generally regarded as equal to their Bumiputra counterparts, and are accorded all the rights of citizenship as under Part II of the Constitution. In recent years, some have sought to provide Malay citizens with more political rights as per the ketuanan Melayu philosophy. However, most of these ketuanan Melayu proponents argue that their additional rights are already written as law and thus only seek to "defend" them from their opponents.

When he assumed the Presidency of UMNO, Tunku Abdul Rahman (later the first Prime Minister of Malaysia) stated that "...when we (the Malays) fought against the Malayan Union (which upset the position of the Malays' rights) the others took no part in it because they said this is purely a Malay concern, and not theirs. They also indicate that they owe their loyalty to their countries of origin, and for that reason they oppose the Barnes Report to make Malay the national language. If we were to hand over the Malays to these so-called Malayans when their nationality has not been defined there will be a lot of problems ahead of us." However, he continued that "For those who love and feel they owe undivided loyalty to this country, we will welcome them as Malayans. They must truly be Malayans, and they will have the same rights and privileges as the Malays."

== Early criticism ==
Article 153, and thus by extension the social contract, has been a source of controversy since the early days of Malaysia. Singaporean politician Lee Kuan Yew of the People's Action Party (PAP) publicly questioned the need for Article 153 in Parliament, and called for a "Malaysian Malaysia" pointing out that if Dato' Syed Ja'afar Albar, a UMNO stalwart who came to Malaya from Indonesia just before the war at the age over thirty, could claim to be Malaysian then so should those non-Malays whose families had lived in Malaysia for generations. "Therefore it is wrong and illogical for a particular racial group to think that they are more justified to be called Malaysians and that the others can become Malaysian only through their favour."

Lee criticised the government's policies by stating that "[t]hey, the Malay, have the right as Malaysian citizens to go up to the level of training and education that the more competitive societies, the non-Malay society, has produced. That is what must be done, isn't it? Not to feed them with this obscurantist doctrine that all they have got to do is to get Malay rights for the few special Malays and their problem has been resolved." He also lamented, "Malaysia – to whom does it belong? To Malaysians. But who are Malaysians? I hope I am, Mr Speaker, Sir. But sometimes, sitting in this chamber, I doubt whether I am allowed to be a Malaysian."

Lee's statements upset many, especially politicians from the Alliance Party, the Barisan Nasional's predecessor. Then Finance Minister Tan Siew Sin of the Malaysian Chinese Association (MCA) called Lee the "greatest, disruptive force in the entire history of Malaysia and Malaya." Tunku Abdul Rahman, the first Prime Minister of Malaysia, considered Lee to be too extremist in his views, while other UMNO politicians thought Lee was simply taking advantage of the situation to pander to the Malaysian Chinese.

PAP–UMNO relations were chilled further by the PAP running several candidates in elections on the Malay Peninsula, with UMNO retaliating by trying to run candidates on its ticket in Singapore. Eventually, Tunku Abdul Rahman decided to kick Singapore out of Malaysia. Lee was saddened by this and shed tears in an interview on national television as Singapore became an independent nation in 1965. The Constitution of Singapore contains an article, Article 152, that names the Malays as "indigenous people" of Singapore and therefore requiring special safeguarding of their rights and privileges as such. However, the article specifies no policies for such safeguarding, and no reference to a "social contract" has ever been made by the PAP government in Singapore.

== Present debate ==
In 2005, the social contract was brought up by Lim Keng Yaik of the Gerakan party in the Barisan Nasional. Lim, a Minister in the government, asked for a re-examination of the social contract so that a "Bangsa Malaysia" (literally Malay for a Malaysian race or Malaysian nation) could be achieved. Lim was severely criticised by many Malay politicians, including Khairy Jamaluddin who is Prime Minister Abdullah Ahmad Badawi's son-in-law and Deputy Chairman of the UMNO Youth wing, and Ahmad Shabery Cheek, a prominent Malay Member of Parliament from the state of Terengganu. The Malay press (most of which is owned by UMNO) also ran articles condemning the questioning of the social contract. Lim was adamant, asking in an interview "How do you expect non-Malays to pour their hearts and souls into the country, and to one day die for it if you keep harping on this? Flag-waving and singing the Negaraku (the national anthem) are rituals, while true love for the nation lies in the heart."

A year earlier, Abdullah had given a speech where he mentioned the most "significant aspect" of the social contract as "the agreement by the indigenous peoples to grant citizenship to the immigrant Chinese and Indians". However, Abdullah went on to state that "the character of the nation" changed to "one that Chinese and Indian citizens could also call their own". However, the speech went largely unremarked.

In the end, Lim stated that the Malay press had blown his comments out of proportion and misquoted him. The issue ended with UMNO Youth chief and Education Minister Hishamuddin Hussein warning people not to "bring up the issue again as it has been agreed upon, appreciated, understood and endorsed by the Constitution."

Earlier that year, Hishamuddin had brandished the keris (a traditional Malay dagger) at the UMNO Annual General Meeting, warning non-Malays not to threaten "Malay rights" and to question the social contract. This was applauded by the UMNO delegates, but widely ridiculed in the Malaysian blogosphere.

Other politicians, mostly from opposition parties, have also criticised the NEP and its provisions, but refrained from directly criticising the social contract or Article 153 of the Constitution. Former Deputy Prime Minister Anwar Ibrahim of the Parti Keadilan Rakyat (PKR) promised he would roll back the NEP if he ever gained power, and many from the Democratic Action Party (DAP) have also spoken out against the NEP. They criticised the NEP as benefiting only a small portion of Malays, mostly well-connected and urban, while ignoring the rural and poor Malays, and noted that the NEP's avowed goal was to give the Malays a 30% share in the country's economic equity, regardless of whether only a few or many Malays held this share. The DAP has been particular in arguing that it does not question Article 153 or the social contract, but merely seeks to abolish inequitable policies such as the NEP.

Article 10 (4) of the Constitution permits the government to ban the questioning of Article 153, and thus the social contract; indeed, the Sedition Act does illegalise such questioning. The Internal Security Act (ISA) also permits the government to detain anybody it desires for practically an indefinite period of time, and many, including politicians from the DAP such as Lim Kit Siang and Karpal Singh have been held under the ISA; it is widely believed this was because of their vehement criticism of Malay privileges.

More recently, some commentators have remarked on younger Malaysians chafing at the terms of the social contract. One wrote that "half a century on, younger non-Malays especially feel they were not parties to deals and contracts (at the time of independence) and should not be beholden to them." In 2006, several non-Malay parties in the ruling Barisan Nasional coalition called for a re-examination of the social contract; Prime Minister Abdullah Ahmad Badawi's refusal to do so reportedly triggered "much consternation". Abdullah was quoted in the Malay media as saying: "If we change this balance and if we are forced to meet all over again on the rights of every group, it will not be the same as now. It would be far from satisfactory. Whatever the new formula, it will not succeed because the old formula is enough, is already maximum. As everyone had agreed to this before, why do we want to disturb this and meet again?"

That year, at the UMNO General Assembly, several delegates criticised other members of the government coalition for criticising the social contract and ketuanan Melayu. One stated that "If they question our rights, then we should question theirs. So far we have not heard the Malays questioning their right to citizenship when they came in droves from other countries." Others argued that the Bumiputra communities continued to lag behind the rest of the country economically, and called for stronger measures in line with the social contract. One delegate, Hashim Suboh, made headlines when he asked Hishammuddin, who had brandished the keris again, "Datuk Hisham has unsheathed his keris, waved his keris, kissed his keris. We want to ask Datuk Hisham when is he going to use it?" Hashim said that "force must be used against those who refused to abide by the social contract", provoking criticism from the DAP, which accused him of sedition.

== See also ==
- Indophobia
- Sinophobia

== Notes and references ==
=== Other references ===
- Adam, Ramlah binti, Samuri, Abdul Hakim bin & Fadzil, Muslimin bin (2004). Sejarah Tingkatan 3. Dewan Bahasa dan Pustaka. ISBN 983-62-8285-8.
- "Anwar: Time to suspend NEP". (28 October 2005). Malaysiakini.
- Badawi, Abdullah Ahmad (2004). "The Challenges of Multireligious, Multiethnic and Multicultural Societies". Retrieved 12 November 2005.
- "Don't Raise Social Contract Issue, Umno Youth Chief Warns". (15 August 2005). Bernama.
- Goh, Cheng Teik (1994). Malaysia: Beyond Communal Politics. Pelanduk Publications. ISBN 967-978-475-4.
- "'Impossible to co-operate with Singapore while Lee is Premier'". (2 June 1965). Straits Times.
- "Johor Umno Says Meritocracy A Form Of Discrimination". (9 July 2005). Bernama.
- Khaw, Ambrose (1998). "This man is making too much noise". Retrieved 11 November 2005.
- Lim, Kit Siang (2002). "Liong Sik and Keng Yaik also suffer from the 'Mudah Lupa' syndrome, forgetting the clear and unequivocal calls by Tunku Abdul Rahman and Hussein Onn and MCA founding fathers not to turn Malaysia into an Islamic state". Retrieved 12 November 2005.
- Lim, Kit Siang (2004). "2004 general election will be a critical test of the reaffirmation or abandonment of the 46-year Merdeka 'social contract' of Malaysia as a democratic, secular and multi-religious nation with Islam as the official religion but not an Islamic State". Retrieved 12 November 2005.
- Musa, M. Bakri (1999). The Malay Dilemma Revisited. Merantau Publishers. ISBN 1-58348-367-5.
- Ooi, Jeff (2004). "Meritocracy: Naked Lies or Partial Truth?". Retrieved 11 November 2005.
- Ooi, Jeff (2005). "The 30% solution". Retrieved 12 November 2005.
- Ooi, Jeff (2005). "New controversy: Social Contract and Bangsa Malaysia". Retrieved 12 November 2005.
- Ooi, Jeff (2005). "Perils of the sitting duck". Retrieved 11 November 2005.
- Ooi, Jeff (2005). "Social Contract: 'Utusan got the context wrong'". Retrieved 11 November 2005.
- Ye, Lin-Sheng (2003). The Chinese Dilemma. East West Publishing. ISBN 0-9751646-1-9.
- Yeoh, Oon (4 June 2004). "Meritocracy: The truth must be well told". The Sun.
- Yusoff, Marzuki & Samah, Nazeri Nong (14 August 2005). "Kontrak sosial: Kenyataan Keng Yaik bercanggah Perlembagaan Persekutuan". Utusan Malaysia.
