= Azimi Daim =

Malaysian politician

Yang Berbahagia Dato' Azimi Daim DSDK DMSM JP
- عظيمي دائم

Kedah State Executive Council
- In office 26 November 2007 – 9 March 2008; Education and Human Development
- Monarch: Abdul Halim
- Menteri Besar: Mahdzir Khalid
- Preceded by: Himself (Education); Othman Ishak (Human Development)
- Succeeded by: Abdullah Jusoh (Education); Ismail Salleh (Human Development)
- Constituency: Bandar Baharu
- In office 29 December 2005 – 26 November 2007; Education, Information Technology, Communication and Multimedia
- Monarch: Abdul Halim
- Menteri Besar: Mahdzir Khalid
- Preceded by: Himself (Education); Khalidah Adibah Ayob (Communication and Multimedia)
- Succeeded by: Himself (Education); Nawawi Ahmad (Information Technology)
- Constituency: Bandar Baharu
- In office 28 March 2004 – 29 December 2005; Education
- Monarch: Abdul Halim
- Menteri Besar: Syed Razak Syed Zain Barakbah
- Preceded by: Othman Ishak
- Succeeded by: Himself
- Constituency: Bandar Baharu

1st Deputy Permanent Chairman of the Malaysian United Indigenous Party
- In office 30 December 2017 – 14 August 2020
- President: Muhyiddin Yassin
- Chairman: Mahathir Mohamad (2017–2020); Muhyiddin Yassin (Acting) (2020)
- Permanent Chairman: Mohd. Shariff Omar
- Preceded by: Position established
- Succeeded by: Hashim Suboh
- Constituency: Kulim-Bandar Baharu

Member of the Kedah State Legislative Assembly for Bandar Baharu
- In office 21 March 2004 – 8 March 2008
- Preceded by: Osman Md Aji (BN–UMNO)
- Succeeded by: Yaakub Hussin (PR–PAS)
- Majority: 3,878 (2004)

Personal details
- Born: Azimi bin Daim; 22 April 1964 (age 62) Sungai Petani, Kedah, Malaysia
- Citizenship: Malaysian
- Party: United Malays National Organisation (UMNO) (2012–2016); Malaysian United Indigenous Party (BERSATU) (2016–2020); Homeland Fighters' Party (PEJUANG) (since 2020)
- Other political affiliations: Barisan Nasional (BN) (2012–2016); Pakatan Harapan (PH) (2016–2020); Perikatan Nasional (PN) (2026-present)
- Children: 4
- Education: MARA University of Technology; University of Hartford
- Occupation: Politician
- Website: Facebook

Dato' Azimi bin Daim is a Malaysian politician who served as Member of the Kedah State Executive Council (EXCO) in the Barisan Nasional (BN) state administration under former Menteris Besar Syed Razak Syed Zain Barakbah and Mahdzir Khalid and Member of the Kedah State Legislative Assembly (MLA) for Bandar Baharu from March 2004 to March 2008. He is a member of the Homeland Fighters' Party (PEJUANG) and was a member of the Malaysian United Indigenous Party (BERSATU), a component party of the ruling Perikatan Nasional (PN) and formerly Pakatan Harapan (PH) coalitions and the United Malays National Organisation (UMNO), a component party of the ruling BN coalition. He served as Deputy Permanent Chairman of BERSATU from December 2017 to August 2020.

Azimi was born on 22 April 1964 in Sungai Petani, Kedah. He graduated from Universiti Teknologi MARA and also studied at University of Hartford.

Before joining BERSATU at its inception in 2016, Azimi was a Supreme Council Member (2000-2003) and Information Chief of the Youth wing of the United Malays National Organisation (UMNO). He was formerly the Political Secretary of the Kedah Menteri Besar and Kedah state executive councillors. He was also the former Kedah State Legislative Assemblyman for Bandar Baharu from 2004 to 2008. He was appointed as the Deputy Permanent Chairman of BERSATU during the party General Assembly at Shah Alam on 30 December 2017.

== Controversy ==
In 2006, together with Hashim Suboh and Hasnoor Hussein, he was officially reprimanded by UMNO for stating that "when tension rises, the blood of Malay warriors will run in our veins", which the opposition Democratic Action Party (DAP) had alleged was seditious. This was reportedly the first time UMNO leaders had been reprimanded for the content of their speeches. Azimi said:

I accept the advice as a reminder for myself for the future. I admit my mistake and will accept the advice of the supreme council. But it doesn't mean I cannot speak on the rights and priorities of the Malays. It's just that I'll be more careful. ... It was not meant to be threatening but more of a reminder for the younger generation. I've been speaking in the party general assembly since 1997. Some even consider me as a seasoned speaker. I have used the same style of speaking since Day One. But I'm surprised at how this issue has been played up.

Azimi blamed the opposition parties of the DAP and People's Justice Party (Keadilan) for blowing the issue out of proportion.

== Election results ==
Kedah State Legislative Assembly
Year	Constituency	Candidate	Votes	Pct	Opponent(s)	Votes	Pct	Ballots cast	Majority	Turnout
2004	N36 Bandar Baharu	Azimi Daim (UMNO)	10,752	59.53%	Yaakub Hussin (PAS)	6,874	38.06%	18,060	3,878	78.94%
2008	N36 Bandar Baharu	Azimi Daim (UMNO)	7,860	42.65%	Yaakub Hussin (PAS)	9,709	52.68%	18,431	1,849	78.78%
2008	N36 Bandar Baharu	Azimi Daim (UMNO)	7,860	42.65%	Abd Aziz Majid (IND)	377	2.05%	18,431	1,849	78.78%
2018	N36 Bandar Baharu	Azimi Daim (BERSATU)	7,507	26.80%	Norsabrina Mohd Noor (UMNO)	7,884	28.10%	23,473	377	83.80%
2018	N36 Bandar Baharu	Azimi Daim (BERSATU)	7,507	26.80%	Rohaizat Ja'afar (PAS)	7,506	26.80%	23,473	377	83.80%

== Honours ==
- Malacca
  - Companion Class I of the Exalted Order of Malacca (DMSM) – Datuk (2003)
- Kedah
  - Knight Companion of the Order of Loyalty to the Royal House of Kedah (DSDK) – Dato' (2006)
  - Justice of the Peace of Kedah (JP) (2014)
