= Norsabrina Mohd Noor =

Malaysian politician

Yang Berbahagia Dato' Norsabrina Mohd Noor DSDK SMK PJK BCM
- نورصابرينا بنت محمد نور

Member of the Kedah State Executive Council
- In office 16 May 2013 – 11 May 2018 (Science, Innovation, Information Technology, Communication, High Technology, and Information Sources)
- Monarchs: Abdul Halim (2013–2017); Sallehuddin (2017–2018)
- Menteri Besar: Mukhriz Mahathir (2013–2016); Ahmad Bashah Md Hanipah (2016–2018)
- Preceded by: Ismail Salleh
- Succeeded by: Zamri Yusuf (Science, Innovation and Information Technology); Salmee Said (Communication, High Technology, and Information Sources)
- Constituency: Bandar Baharu

Member of the Kedah State Legislative Assembly for Bandar Baharu
- In office 5 May 2013 – 12 August 2023
- Preceded by: Yaakub Hussin (PR–PAS)
- Succeeded by: Mohd Suffian Yusoff (PN–PAS)
- Majority: 2,069 (2013); 377 (2018)

Personal details
- Born: Norsabrina binti Mohd Noor; 16 January 1979 (age 47) Kampung Sungai Kob, Karangan, Kulim District, Kedah, Malaysia
- Citizenship: Malaysian
- Party: United Malays National Organisation (UMNO)
- Other political affiliations: Barisan Nasional (BN)
- Spouse: Azizan Mat
- Children: 4
- Occupation: Politician

Norsabrina binti Mohd Noor is a Malaysian politician who served as Member of the Kedah State Executive Council (EXCO) in the Barisan Nasional (BN) state administration under former Menteris Besar Mukhriz Mahathir and Ahmad Bashah Md Hanipah from May 2013 to the collapse of the BN state administration in May 2018 as well as Member of the Kedah State Legislative Assembly (MLA) for Bandar Baharu from May 2013 to August 2023. She is a member of the United Malays National Organisation (UMNO), a component party of the BN coalition.

== Election results ==
Kedah State Legislative Assembly
Year	Constituency	Candidate	Votes	Pct	Opponent(s)	Votes	Pct	Ballots cast	Majority	Turnout
2013	N36 Bandar Baharu	Norsabrina Mohd Noor (UMNO)	12,361	54.57%	Mohd Khari Mohd Salleh (PAS)	10,292	45.43%	23,012	2,069	87.30%
2018	N36 Bandar Baharu	Norsabrina Mohd Noor (UMNO)	7,884	34.43%	Azimi Daim (BERSATU)	7,507	32.79%	23,473	377	83.80%
2018	N36 Bandar Baharu	Norsabrina Mohd Noor (UMNO)	7,884	34.43%	Rohaizat Jaafar (PAS)	7,506	32.78%	23,473	377	83.80%

== Honours ==
- Kedah
  - Knight Companion of the Order of Loyalty to the Royal House of Kedah (DSDK) – Dato' (2015)
  - Companion of the Order of the Crown of Kedah (SMK) (2014)
  - Meritorious Service Medal (PJK) (2004)
- Malacca
  - Recipient of the Distinguished Service Star (BCM) (2007)
