= Mohd Suffian Yusoff =

Malaysian politician

Yang Berhormat Mohd Suffian Yusoff AMK MLA
- محمد سفيان يوسف

Member of the Kedah State Legislative Assembly for Bandar Baharu
- Incumbent
- Assumed office 12 August 2023
- Preceded by: Norsabrina Mohd Noor (BN–UMNO)
- Majority: 11,577 (2023)

Personal details
- Born: 29 June 1969 (age 57) Kampung Kuala Selama, Serdang, Kedah, Malaysia
- Party: Malaysian Islamic Party (PAS)
- Other political affiliations: Perikatan Nasional (PN)
- Occupation: Politician, academic

Mohd Suffian bin Yusoff is a Malaysian politician and academic who has served as Member of the Kedah State Legislative Assembly (MLA) for Bandar Baharu since August 2023. He is a member of Malaysian Islamic Party (PAS), a component party of Perikatan Nasional (PN).

== Education ==
Mohd Suffian Yusoff holds a PhD of Environmental Engineering from Universiti Sains Malaysia in 2006, MSc of Mineral Resources Engineering in Universiti Sains Malaysia in 2000 and Bac.Agric.Sc. (Hons.) of Agricultural Science from Universiti Pertanian Malaysia in 1995.

== Election results ==
Kedah State Legislative Assembly
Year	Constituency	Candidate	Votes	Pct	Opponent(s)	Votes	Pct	Ballots cast	Majority	Turnout
2023	N36 Bandar Baharu	Mohd Suffian Yusoff (PAS)	19,327	71.38%	Nuraini Yusoff (UMNO)	7,750	28.62%	27,270	11,577	75.41%

== Honours ==
- Kedah
  - Member of the Order of the Crown of Kedah (AMK) (2025)
