= Malay Agenda =

Concept in Malaysian politics

In Malaysian politics, the Malay Agenda is a concept related to the ideal of ketuanan Melayu (Malay supremacy or dominance). Although it did not feature in public discussion for much of the 20th century, in the early 2000s, it came to prominence due to its usage in the discourse of several politicians from the United Malays National Organisation (UMNO), the leading political party in Malaysia. The Malay Agenda is closely related to the UMNO, which sees itself as the guardian of the Malay ethnic group in Malaysia.

== Definition ==
According to one local academic, the Malay Agenda constitutes the special privileges granted to the Malays and other indigenous peoples (collectively referred to as Bumiputras) in the Constitution of Malaysia. This would include the articles relating to the Malay monarchs and the Malaysian head of state, the Yang di-Pertuan Agong, the portions of the Constitution pertaining to Malay-associated national symbols such as the position of Islam as the state religion, Malay land reservations, and the status of the Malay language as the national language. The controversial Article 153, which grants Malays several preferences and quotas in the sphere of education, employment and the civil service, would also fall under the Malay Agenda. It is held that non-Malay Malaysians were granted Malaysian citizenship in return for their acceptance of the Malay Agenda — in another sense, the Malay Agenda represents half of the Malaysian social contract, with the other half being the granting of citizenship to the non-Malays.

Different states emphasises different aspects of the Malay Agenda. In the Federal Territory of Kuala Lumpur, urban poverty and slums are the main target of the UMNO delegation. In rural states like Terengganu, poverty eradication and religion are underscored.

== Modern usage ==
The Malay Agenda has been particularly prominent in UMNO General Assemblies. It is often associated by politicians with Malay political primacy, as an embodied by ketuanan Melayu, and the Malaysian New Economic Policy (NEP), which grants Malays substantial preferences and quotas in the private sector.

In the 2006 UMNO General Assembly, several politicians brought up the issue of leaders from other members of the governing coalition, the Barisan Nasional, who criticised or questioned the government's ethnic policies. One analyst said: "This AGM is quite interesting in other ways, apart from the feuding that does exist, which seems to purport that there are different groups in opposition to each other within the ruling party; it's clearly a question of what we might call simply as a Malay agenda, and the Malay agenda is the primacy of Malays in politics in this country."

At the Assembly, Education Minister and UMNO Youth Chief Hishamuddin Hussein, who had made headlines when he brandished a kris (a Malay dagger) at the previous year's Assembly, stated that "The Malay Agenda in the National Mission should not be regarded as a zero-sum game, by saying only the Malays are benefiting and that the non-Malays are losing out. The non-bumiputeras should be brave enough to admit that during the implementation of the New Economic Policy, they also derived benefits, either directly or indirectly, through projects in the various sectors." Other delegates spoke out against the perceived economic inequities, citing the Malays' official share of equity that stood at 18%, although Malays comprised almost half the Malaysian population.

The share of equity itself had been disputed not long before when a local think tank calculated the Malay share of equity to stand at 45% in 2006, based on the 1,000 publicly listed companies. This significantly exceeded the government target of 30%, which had been set by the NEP. However, the figures were disputed by the government, which used par value instead of market value to calculate equity, did not consider any portion of government-linked companies to be Malay-owned, and looked at all 600,000 registered companies instead of just the publicly listed ones. Critics argued, however, that the usage of par value was antiquated and did not reflect the true value of the equity owned.

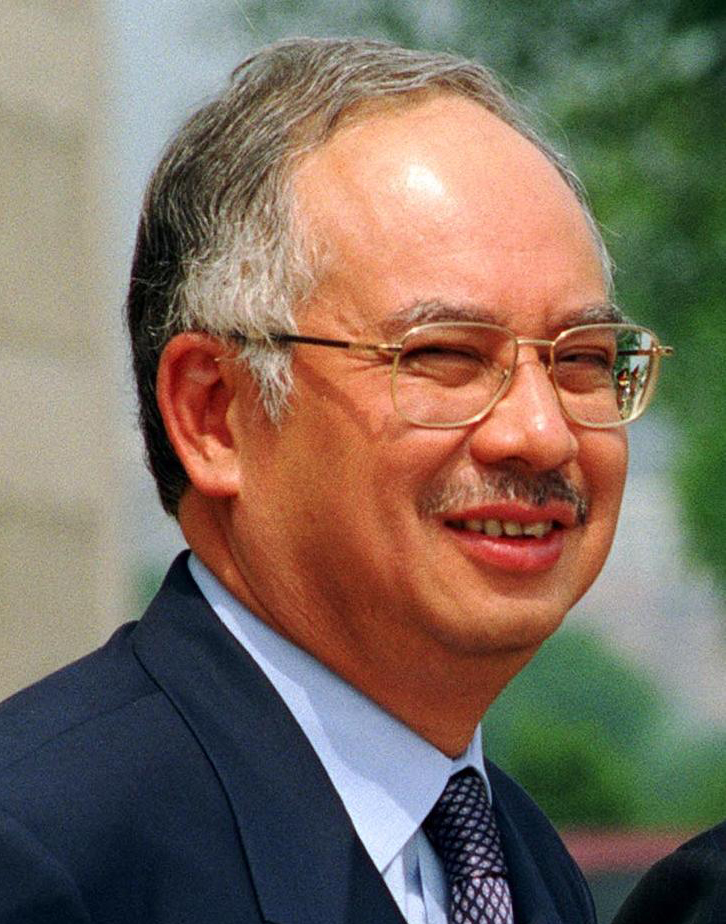
Deputy Prime Minister Najib Tun Razak said there would be no time limit for the expiration of the Malay Agenda.

At the Assembly, some responded by calling for the Malay equity target to be increased to 70%, in line with the Malay Agenda. At the same time, Deputy Prime Minister Najib Tun Razak said that there would be no time limit set for the achievement of the Malay Agenda, arguing that four centuries of colonialist oppression of the Malays could not be undone in a few decades.

== See also ==
- Article 153 of the Constitution of Malaysia
- Bumiputera (Malaysia)
- Ketuanan Melayu
- Malaysian New Economic Policy
- Social contract (Malaysia)
