= Bandar Baharu (state constituency) =

Political subdivision in Malaysia

Bandar Baharu (N36)
Kedah constituency

State constituency
- Legislature: Kedah State Legislative Assembly
MLA
Mohd Suffian Yusoff
PN
- Constituency created: 1959
- Constituency abolished: 1974
- Constituency re-created: 1986
- First contested: 1959
- Last contested: 2023

Demographics
- Electors (2023): 36,164

Bandar Baharu is a state constituency in Kedah, Malaysia, that is represented in the Kedah State Legislative Assembly.

The ethnic demographics of this state constituency is 79.15% Malay, 13.74% Chinese, 6.92% Indian and 0.18% Others

== Demographics ==
As of 2020, Bandar Baharu has a population of 44,412 people.

Ethnic breakdown of Bandar Baharu's electorate as of 2023
1. Malay (80.0%)
2. Chinese (13.3%)
3. Indian (6.36%)
4. Other ethnicities (0.37%)

== History ==
=== Polling districts ===
According to the gazette issued on 30 March 2018, the Bandar Baharu constituency has a total of 18 polling districts.

| State constituency | Polling districts | Code | Location |
|---|---|---|---|
| Bandar Baharu (N36) | Sungai Batu | 018/36/01 | SK Sungai Batu |
| Bandar Baharu (N36) | Sungai Taka | 018/36/02 | SK Sungai Taka |
| Bandar Baharu (N36) | Sungai Tengas | 018/36/03 | SMK Selama |
| Bandar Baharu (N36) | Selama | 018/36/04 | SK Selama |
| Bandar Baharu (N36) | Batu Lintang | 018/36/05 | SK Sungai Salleh |
| Bandar Baharu (N36) | Kampung Ee Guan | 018/36/06 | SMK Serdang |
| Bandar Baharu (N36) | Pekan Serdang | 018/36/07 | SK Jalan Selama |
| Bandar Baharu (N36) | Batu 16 | 018/36/08 | SK Dato' Hj Zainuddin |
| Bandar Baharu (N36) | Relau | 018/36/09 | SK Relau |
| Bandar Baharu (N36) | Sungai Kechil Illir | 018/36/10 | SK Sungai Kechil Ilir |
| Bandar Baharu (N36) | Ayer Puteh | 018/36/11 | SK Ayer Puteh |
| Bandar Baharu (N36) | Telok Sera | 018/36/12 | SK Lubok Buntar |
| Bandar Baharu (N36) | Pekan Lubok Buntar | 018/36/13 | SJK (C) Poay Chai |
| Bandar Baharu (N36) | Kerat Telunjok | 018/36/14 | SK Permatang Kerat Telunjuk |
| Bandar Baharu (N36) | Sungai Kechil Ulu | 018/36/15 | SK Sungai Kechil Ulu |
| Bandar Baharu (N36) | Parit Nibong | 018/36/16 | Pusat Sumber KEMAS Kegiatan Desa Parit Nibong |
| Bandar Baharu (N36) | Permatang Pasir | 018/36/17 | SK Permatang Pasir |
| Bandar Baharu (N36) | Bandar Baharu | 018/36/18 | SK Bandar Baharu |

=== Representation history ===
Kedah State Legislative Assemblyman for Bandar Baharu
| Assembly | No | Years | Member | Party |
Constituency created
Bandar Bahru
| 1st | N24 | 1959–1964 | Zainuddin Haji Din | Alliance (UMNO) |
| 2nd | N24 | 1964–1969 | Zainuddin Haji Din | Alliance (UMNO) |
| | | 1969–1971 | State assembly was suspended | |
| 3rd | N24 | 1971–1973 | Zainuddin Haji Din | Alliance (UMNO) |
| 3rd | N24 | 1973–1974 | Zainuddin Haji Din | BN (UMNO) |
Constituency renamed to Serdang
Constituency re-created from Serdang
Bandar Baharu
| 7th | N28 | 1986–1990 | Abdul Majid Itam | BN (UMNO) |
| 8th | N28 | 1990–1995 | Husain Abd. Rahman | BN (UMNO) |
| 9th | N36 | 1995–1999 | Muhamad Fishol Said | BN (UMNO) |
| 10th | N36 | 1999–2004 | Osman Md Aji | BN (UMNO) |
| 11th | N36 | 2004–2008 | Azimi Daim | BN (UMNO) |
| 12th | N36 | 2008–2013 | Yaakub Hussin | PR (PAS) |
| 13th | N36 | 2013–2018 | Norsabrina Mohd. Noor | BN (UMNO) |
| 14th | N36 | 2018–2023 | Norsabrina Mohd. Noor | BN (UMNO) |
| 15th | N36 | 2023–present | Mohd Suffian Yusoff | PN (PAS) |

== Election results ==
Kedah state election, 2023
| Party | Candidate | Votes | % | ∆% |
|---|---|---|---|---|
| PN | Mohd Suffian Yusoff | 19,327 | 71.38 | ▲71.38 |
| BN | Nuraini Yusoff | 7,750 | 28.62 | ▼5.81 |
| Total valid votes | | 27,077 | 100.00 | |
| Total rejected ballots | | 169 | | |
| Unreturned ballots | | 24 | | |
| Turnout | | 27,270 | 75.41 | ▼8.39 |
| Registered electors | | 36,164 | | |
| Majority | | 11,577 | 42.76 | ▲41.12 |
| PN gain from BN | | Swing | | ? |

Kedah state election, 2018
| Party | Candidate | Votes | % | ∆% |
|---|---|---|---|---|
| BN | Norsabrina Mohd. Noor | 7,884 | 34.43 | ▼20.14 |
| PKR | Azimi Daim | 7,507 | 32.79 | ▲32.79 |
| PAS | Rohaizat Jaafar | 7,506 | 32.78 | ▼12.65 |
| Total valid votes | | 22,897 | 100.00 | |
| Total rejected ballots | | 406 | | |
| Unreturned ballots | | 0 | | |
| Turnout | | 23,473 | 83.80 | ▼3.40 |
| Registered electors | | 28,015 | | |
| Majority | | 377 | 1.64 | ▼7.50 |
| BN hold | | Swing | | |

Kedah state election, 2013
| Party | Candidate | Votes | % | ∆% |
|---|---|---|---|---|
| BN | Norsabrina Mohd. Noor | 12,361 | 54.57 | ▲10.77 |
| PAS | Mohd Khairi Mohd Salleh | 10,292 | 45.43 | ▼8.67 |
| Total valid votes | | 22,653 | 100.00 | |
| Total rejected ballots | | 359 | | |
| Unreturned ballots | | 122 | | |
| Turnout | | 23,134 | 87.20 | ▲8.42 |
| Registered electors | | 26,506 | | |
| Majority | | 2,069 | 9.14 | ▼1.16 |
| BN gain from PAS | | Swing | | ? |

Kedah state election, 2008
| Party | Candidate | Votes | % | ∆% |
|---|---|---|---|---|
| PAS | Yaakub Hussin | 9,709 | 54.10 | ▲15.10 |
| BN | Azimi Daim | 7,860 | 43.80 | ▼17.20 |
| Independent | Abdul Aziz Majid | 377 | 2.10 | ▲2.10 |
| Total valid votes | | 17,946 | 100.00 | |
| Total rejected ballots | | 456 | | |
| Unreturned ballots | | 29 | | |
| Turnout | | 18,431 | 78.78 | ▼0.16 |
| Registered electors | | 23,397 | | |
| Majority | | 1,849 | 10.30 | ▼11.70 |
| PAS gain from BN | | Swing | | ? |

Kedah state election, 2004
| Party | Candidate | Votes | % | ∆% |
|---|---|---|---|---|
| BN | Azimi Daim | 10,752 | 61.00 | ▲5.24 |
| PAS | Yaakub Hussin | 6,874 | 39.00 | ▼5.24 |
| Total valid votes | | 16,626 | 100.00 | |
| Total rejected ballots | | 410 | | |
| Unreturned ballots | | 24 | | |
| Turnout | | 18,060 | 78.94 | ▲3.49 |
| Registered electors | | 22,877 | | |
| Majority | | 3,878 | 22.00 | ▲10.48 |
| BN hold | | Swing | | |

Kedah state election, 1999
| Party | Candidate | Votes | % | ∆% |
|---|---|---|---|---|
| BN | Osman Md Aji | 8,923 | 55.76 | ▼16.48 |
| PAS | Yaakub Hussin | 7,079 | 44.24 | ▲16.48 |
| Total valid votes | | 16,002 | 100.00 | |
| Total rejected ballots | | 430 | | |
| Unreturned ballots | | 28 | | |
| Turnout | | 16,460 | 75.45 | ▲3.73 |
| Registered electors | | 21,817 | | |
| Majority | | 1,844 | 11.52 | ▼32.96 |
| BN hold | | Swing | | |

Kedah state election, 1995
| Party | Candidate | Votes | % | ∆% |
|---|---|---|---|---|
| BN | Muhamad Fishol Said | 10,652 | 72.24 | ▲1.58 |
| PAS | Abdul Raman Abdul Razak @ Hasan Abdul Razak | 4,093 | 27.76 | ▼1.58 |
| Total valid votes | | 14,745 | 100.00 | |
| Total rejected ballots | | 557 | | |
| Unreturned ballots | | 34 | | |
| Turnout | | 15,336 | 71.72 | ▼5.15 |
| Registered electors | | 21,382 | | |
| Majority | | 6,559 | 44.48 | ▲3.16 |
| BN hold | | Swing | | |

Kedah state election, 1990
| Party | Candidate | Votes | % | ∆% |
|---|---|---|---|---|
| BN | Husain Abd. Rahman | 9,940 | 70.66 | ▲4.73 |
| PAS | Hassan Abd. Razak | 4,127 | 29.34 | ▼4.73 |
| Total valid votes | | 14,067 | 100.00 | |
| Total rejected ballots | | 539 | | |
| Unreturned ballots | | 0 | | |
| Turnout | | 14,606 | 76.87 | ▲5.01 |
| Registered electors | | 19,002 | | |
| Majority | | 5,813 | 41.32 | ▲9.46 |
| BN hold | | Swing | | |

Kedah state election, 1986
| Party | Candidate | Votes | % | ∆% |
|---|---|---|---|---|
| BN | Abdul Majid Itam | 8,348 | 65.93 | ▼1.09 |
| PAS | Othman Razak | 4,361 | 34.07 | ▲1.09 |
| Total valid votes | | 12,799 | 100.00 | |
| Total rejected ballots | | 517 | | |
| Unreturned ballots | | 0 | | |
| Turnout | | 13,226 | 71.86 | ▼7.34 |
| Registered electors | | 18,404 | | |
| Majority | | 3,987 | 31.86 | ▲2.18 |
| BN hold | | Swing | | |

Kedah state election, 1969: Bandar Bahru
| Party | Candidate | Votes | % | ∆% |
|---|---|---|---|---|
| Alliance | Zainuddin Haji Din | 6,503 | 64.84 | ▼3.03 |
| PMIP | Md Rejab Awang Kechik | 3,526 | 35.16 | ▲16.78 |
| Total valid votes | | 10,029 | 100.00 | |
| Total rejected ballots | | 886 | | |
| Unreturned ballots | | 0 | | |
| Turnout | | 10.915 | 79.20 | ▼1.20 |
| Registered electors | | 13,780 | | |
| Majority | | 2,977 | 29.68 | ▼19.41 |
| Alliance hold | | Swing | | |

Kedah state election, 1964: Bandar Bahru
| Party | Candidate | Votes | % | ∆% |
|---|---|---|---|---|
| Alliance | Zainuddin Haji Din | 7,101 | 67.47 | ▼10.01 |
| PMIP | Ghazali Haji Mohamad | 1,934 | 18.38 | ▼4.14 |
| Socialist Front | Tan Boon Song | 1,490 | 14.16 | ▲14.16 |
| Total valid votes | | 10,525 | 100.00 | |
| Total rejected ballots | | 454 | | |
| Unreturned ballots | | 0 | | |
| Turnout | | 10.979 | 80.40 | ▼1.70 |
| Registered electors | | 13,657 | | |
| Majority | | 5,167 | 49.09 | ▼5.87 |
| Alliance hold | | Swing | | |

Kedah state election, 1959: Bandar Bahru
| Party | Candidate | Votes | % |
|---|---|---|---|
| Alliance | Zainuddin Haji Din | 6,780 | 77.48 |
| PMIP | Ghazali Haji Mohamad | 1,971 | 22.52 |
| Total valid votes | | 8,751 | 100.00 |
| Total rejected ballots | | 194 | |
| Unreturned ballots | | 0 | |
| Turnout | | 8,945 | 82.10 |
| Registered electors | | 10,901 | |
| Majority | | 4,808 | 54.96 |
This was a new constituency created.
