= Dangerous Drugs (Special Preventive Measures) Act 1985 =

Parliament of Malaysia
- Long title: An Act to provide for the preventive detention of persons associated with any activity relating to or involving the trafficking in dangerous drugs.
- Citation: Act 316
- Territorial extent: Throughout Malaysia
- Passed by: Dewan Rakyat
- Passed: 11 April 1985
- Passed by: Dewan Negara
- Passed: 24 April 1985
- Royal assent: 22 May 1985
- Commenced: 30 May 1985
- Effective: [15 June 1985, P.U. (B) 305/1985]

Legislative history

Initiating chamber: Dewan Rakyat
- Bill title: Dangerous Drugs (Special Preventive Measures) Bill 1984
- Bill citation: D.R. 40/1984
- Introduced by: Mohd Radzi Sheikh Ahmad, Deputy Minister of Home Affairs
- First reading: 17 October 1984
- Second reading: 11 April 1985
- Third reading: 11 April 1985

Revising chamber: Dewan Negara
- Bill title: Dangerous Drugs (Special Preventive Measures) Bill 1984
- Bill citation: D.R. 40/1984
- Member(s) in charge: Mohd Radzi Sheikh Ahmad, Deputy Minister of Home Affairs
- First reading: 15 April 1985
- Second reading: 24 April 1985
- Third reading: 24 April 1985

Amended by
- Dangerous Drugs (Special Preventive Measures) (Amendment) Act 1985 [Act A629] Dangerous Drugs (Special Preventive Measures) (Amendment) Act 1988 [Act A707] Dangerous Drugs (Special Preventive Measures) (Amendment) Act 1989 [Act A738] Dangerous Drugs (Special Preventive Measures) (Amendment) Act 1990 [Act A766]

Keywords
- Preventive detention
- Status: In force

The Dangerous Drugs (Special Preventive Measures) Act 1985 (Malay: Akta Dadah Berbahaya (Langkah-langkah Pencegahan Khas) 1985), is a Malaysian laws which enacted to provide for the preventive detention of persons associated with any activity relating to or involving the trafficking in dangerous drugs.

== Preamble ==
Preamble of the Act provides the following considerations:

1. WHEREAS action which is prejudicial to public order in Malaysia has been taken and further similar action is being threatened by a substantial body of persons both inside and outside Malaysia;
2. AND WHEREAS Parliament considers it necessary to stop such action;

== Structure ==
The Dangerous Drugs (Special Preventive Measures) Act 1985, in its current form (1 January 2006), consists of 2 Parts containing 25 sections and no schedule (including 4 amendments).

- Part I: Preliminary
- Part II: Powers of Preventive Detention
