= Reid Commission =

Malaysian constitution drafting body

The Reid Commission was an independent commission responsible for drafting the Constitution of the Federation of Malaya prior to Malayan independence from the United Kingdom on 31 August 1957.

== Constitutional conference ==
A constitutional conference was held in London from 18 January to 6 February 1956 attended by a delegation from the Federation of Malaya, consisting of four representatives of the Malay Rulers, the Chief Minister of the Federation (Tunku Abdul Rahman) and three other ministers, and also by the British High Commissioner in Malaya and his advisers.

The conference proposed the appointment of an independent commission to devise a constitution for a fully self-governing and independent Federation of Malaya. This proposal was accepted by Queen Elizabeth II and the Malay rulers.

== Appointment of Reid Commission members ==
In March 1956, an independent commission to draw up a constitution for a fully self-governing and independent Malaya was set up. Accordingly, a commission headed by Lord Reid, a distinguished Lord of Appeal in ordinary, and consisting of constitutional experts from fellow Commonwealth countries was appointed by the Queen Elizabeth II and the Malay Rulers. The commission was appropriately called the Reid Commission. The commission was to include a Canadian representative, but they were unable to attend for reasons of ill health.

- Lord Reid – United Kingdom (Chairman)
- Sir Ivor Jennings – United Kingdom
- Sir William McKell – Australia
- Hakim B. Malik – India
- Sheikh Hakim Halim bin Abdul Hamid – Pakistan

== Meetings and receiving memoranda ==
The Reid Commission met 118 times between June and October 1956 and received 131 memoranda from various individuals and organisations, including proposals from the Alliance Party and the Conference of Rulers.

== Submitting report ==
The commission submitted its working draft on 21 February 1957, which was scrutinised by a Working Committee. The Working Committee consisted of four representatives from the Malay rulers, another four from the Alliance government, the British High Commissioner, the Chief Secretary, and the Attorney General.

=== Table of contents ===
- Chapter I – General Introduction
- Chapter II – Historical Introduction
- Chapter III – Citizenship
- Chapter IV – Parliament and the Executive
- Chapter V – Division of Legislative and Executive Powers
- Chapter VI – The Judiciary
- Chapter VII – Finance
- Chapter VIII – The Public Services
- Chapter IX – Fundamental Rights
- Chapter X – The States
- Chapter XI – The Settlements
- Chapter XII – Summary of Recommendations

== Drafting constitution ==
Although enshrining concepts such as federalism and a constitutional monarchy, the proposed Malayan constitution by the Reid Commission also contained provisions protecting special position for the Malays, such as quotas in admission to higher education and the civil service, and making Islam the official religion of the federation. It also made Malay the official language of the nation, but the right to vernacular education in Chinese and Tamil would be protected.

Although Tunku Abdul Rahman and the Malay rulers had asked the Reid Commission to ensure that "in an independent Malaya all nationals should be accorded equal rights, privileges and opportunities and there must not be discrimination on grounds of race and creed", the Malay's special position, which many in the ruling United Malays National Organisation backed, were cited as necessary by the Reid Commission as a form of affirmative action. The controversial measures were included as Articles 3, 152 and 153 of the Constitution.

On the basis of their recommendations, the new Federal Constitution was passed by the Parliament of the United Kingdom in June 1957. The constitution draft was presented, debated and passed the Federal Legislative Council on August 15, 1957, and the Constitution took effect on August 27, but there was no referendum involving Malayan people to be held.

However, formal independence was achieved only on August 31, when the Federation of Malaya became an independent sovereign country.

The constitutional machinery devised to bring the new constitution into force consisted of the following:

- In the United Kingdom, the Federation of Malaya Independence Act 1957, together with the Orders in Council made under it.
- The Federation of Malaya Agreement 1957 between the government of the United Kingdom and the government of the Federation of Malaya.
- In the Federation, the Federal Constitution Ordinance 1957 by the Parliament.
- In each of the Malay states, state enactments approving and giving force of law to the federal constitution.

== Aftermath ==
Large-scale amendments to the Constitution were made when Singapore, Sabah and Sarawak merged with the Federation of Malaya to form the Federation of Malaysia in 1963. It then became known as the Federal Constitution.

== See also ==
- Cobbold Commission

== Sources ==
- Mohamed Suffian Hashim, An Introduction to the Constitution of Malaysia, second edition, Kuala Lumpur: Government Printers, 1976.
