= Constitution of Malaysia =

Fundamental law of Malaysia

Federal Constitution of Malaysia
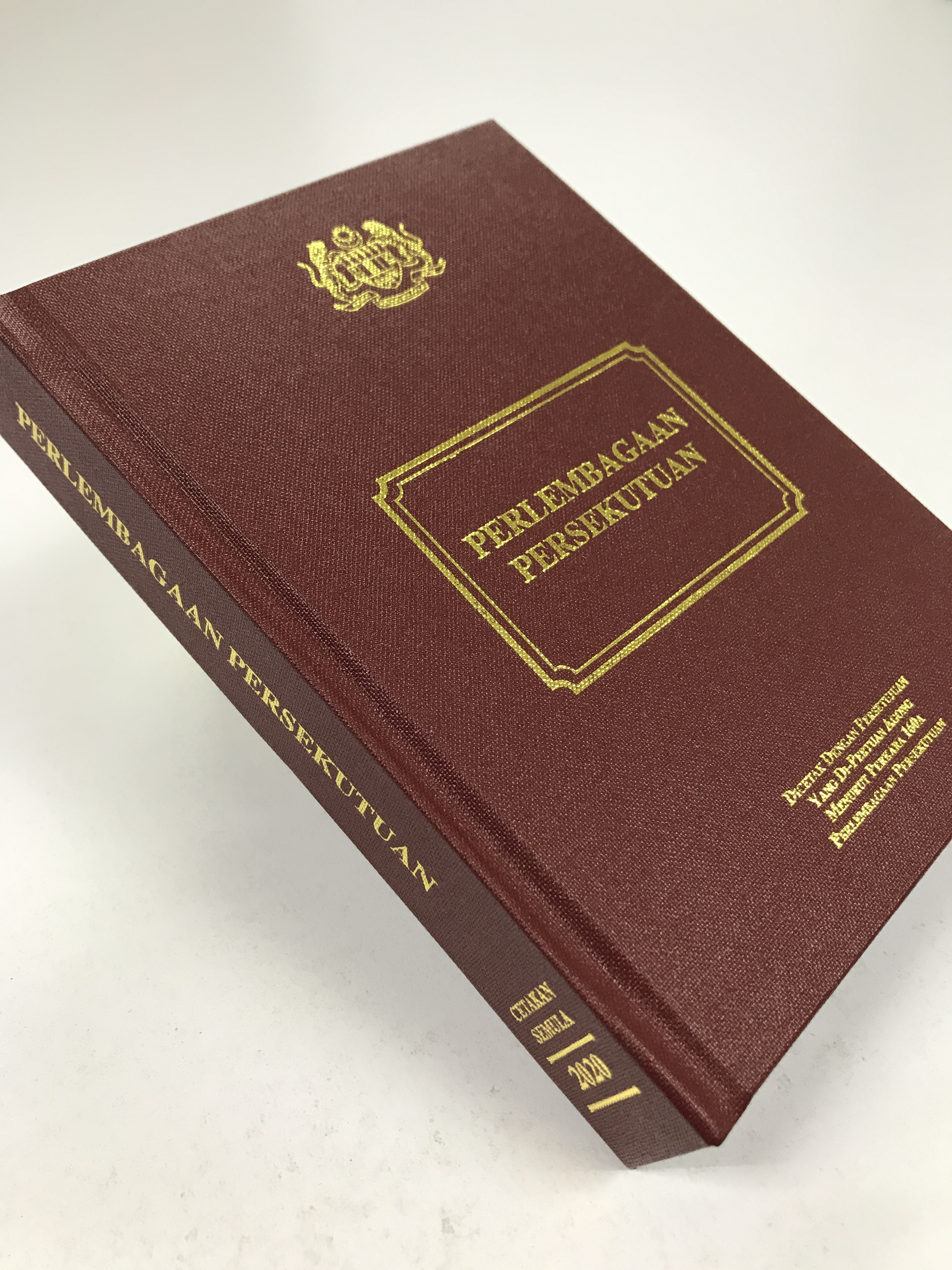
- The Federal Constitution reprint 2020

Overview
- Original title: Perlembagaan Persekutuan Malaysia
- Jurisdiction: Malaysia
- Ratified: 27 August 1957
- Date effective: 31 August 1957
- System: Federal parliamentary constitutional monarchy

Government structure
- Branches: Three (Executive, Legislature and Judiciary)
- Head of state: Yang Di-Pertuan Agong
- Chambers: Two (Dewan Negara and Dewan Rakyat)
- Executive: Cabinet
- Judiciary: Federal Court, Court of Appeal, High Courts
- Federalism: Federal

History
- Amendments: 63
- Last amended: 5 October 2022
- Signatories: Delegates of the Reid Commission and later of the Cobbold Commission

Full text
- Constitution of Malaysia at Wikisource

The Federal Constitution of Malaysia (Malay: Perlembagaan Persekutuan Malaysia), which came into force in 1957 as the Constitution of the Federation of Malaya and was amended in 1963 to form the Constitution of Malaysia, is the supreme law of Malaysia and contains a total of 183 articles. It is a written legal document influenced by two previous documents, the Federation of Malaya Agreement 1948 and the Independence Constitution of 1957. The Federation was initially called the Federation of Malaya (Malay: Persekutuan Tanah Melayu) and it adopted its present name, Malaysia, when the states of Sabah, Sarawak and Singapore (now independent) became part of the Federation. The Constitution establishes the Federation as a constitutional monarchy, having the Yang di-Pertuan Agong as the Head of State with largely ceremonial roles. It provides for the establishment and organisation of three main branches of the government: the bicameral legislative branch called the Parliament, which consists of the House of Representatives (Dewan Rakyat) and the Senate (Dewan Negara); the executive branch led by the Prime Minister and his Cabinet Ministers and the judicial branch headed by the Federal Court.

== History ==
Constitutional Conference: A constitutional conference was held in London from 18 January to 6 February 1956 attended by a delegation from the Federation of Malaya, consisting of four representatives of the Rulers, the Chief Minister of the Federation (Tunku Abdul Rahman) and three other ministers, and also by the British High Commissioner in Malaya and his advisers.

Reid Commission: The conference proposed the appointment of a commission to devise a constitution for a fully self-governing and independent Federation of Malaya. This proposal was accepted by Queen Elizabeth II and the Malay Rulers. Accordingly, pursuant to such agreement, the Reid Commission, consisting of constitutional experts from fellow Commonwealth countries and headed by Lord (William) Reid, a distinguished Lord-of-Appeal-in-Ordinary, was appointed to make recommendations for a suitable constitution. The report of the commission was completed on 11 February 1957. The report was then examined by a working party appointed by the British Government, the Conference of Rulers and the Government of the Federation of Malaya and the Federal Constitution was enacted on the basis of its recommendations.

Constitution: The Constitution as set out under the First Schedule of the Federation of Malaya Agreement 1957 was approved by the Federal Legislative Council on 15 August 1957 through the enactment of Federal Constitution Ordinance 1957, which became effective on 27 August 1957. On 31 August 1957, the Federal Constitution officially came into force and Malaya achieved its independence on that day. This constitution was amended in 1963 by the Malaysia Act to admit Sabah, Sarawak and Singapore as additional member states of the Federation and to make the agreed changes to the constitution that were set out in the Malaysia Agreement, which included changing the name of the Federation to "Malaysia". Thus, legally speaking, the establishment of Malaysia did not create a new nation as such but was simply the addition of new member states to the Federation created by the 1957 constitution, with a change of name.

== Structure ==
The Constitution, in its current form (1 November 2010), consists of 15 Parts containing 230 articles and 13 schedules (including 57 amendments).

=== Parts ===
==== Part I – The States, Religion and Law of the Federation ====
Contains four articles; article 1 to 4. It pertains to the States and Federal Territories of the Federation, admission of new territories, Islam as the Religion of the Federation and the Constitution as the Law of the Federation. But "other religions may be practised in peace and harmony in any part of the Federation".

==== Part II – Fundamental Liberties ====
Contains nine articles; article 5 to 13. It pertains to the liberties of a person as guaranteed by the Constitution, prohibition of slavery and forced labour, protection against retrospective criminal laws and repeated trials, equality before the law, prohibition of banishment and freedom of movement, Freedom of speech, assembly and association, freedom of religion, rights in respect of education and rights to property.

==== Part III – Citizenship ====
Divided into three chapters and contains twenty-six articles; article 14 to 31, minus deleted articles 17, 19A, 20, 21, 30A and 30B. It pertains to various procedures and conditions to acquire Citizenship, its termination procedures and provisions as well as supplemental articles related to citizenship such as Commonwealth Citizenship, citizenship certificate and application of second schedule.

==== Part IV – The Federation ====
Divided into six chapters and contains forty-two articles; article 32 to 69. It details on the structure of the federal government which is composed of Yang di-Pertuan Agong as the supreme head of the Federation, his consort, his deputy, the conference of rulers, the Prime Minister as the head of government and the establishment and proceedings of Parliament of Malaysia as the Federal Legislature. Chapter 1, 2 and 3 describes the powers of Yang di-Pertuan Agong, his consort, his deputy, the conference of rulers and the cabinet as the executive authority of the federation. Chapter 4 and 5 addresses issues like the qualifications of the elected Members of Parliament, the summoning, prorogation and dissolution of the legislature, the election of the Speaker, legislative powers and procedures, and the remuneration of the members of Parliament. Finally, Chapter 6 addresses the capacity of the federation to acquire, hold or dispose of property of any kind, and to sue or be sued.

- Part V – The States
- Part VI – Relations Between the Federation and the States
- Part VII – Financial Provisions
- Part VIII – Elections
- Part IX – The Judiciary
- Part X – Public Services
- Part XI – Special Powers Against Subversion, Organised Violence, and Acts and Crimes Prejudicial to the Public and Emergency Powers
- Part XII – General and Miscellaneous
- Part XIIA – Additional Protections for States of Sabah and Sarawak
- Part XIII – Temporary and Transitional Provisions
- Part XIV – Saving for Rulers' Sovereignty, etc.
- Part XV – Proceedings Against the Yang di-Pertuan Agong and the Rulers

=== Schedules ===
The following is a list of the schedules to the Constitution.

- First Schedule [Articles 18(1), 19(9)] – Oath of Applications for Registration or Naturalization
- Second Schedule [Article 39] – Citizenship by operation of law of persons born before, on or after Malaysia Day and supplementary provisions relating to citizenship
- Third Schedule [Articles 32 and 33] – Election of Yang di-Pertuan Agong and Timbalan Yang di-Pertuan Agong
- Fourth Schedule [Article 37] – Oaths of Office of Yang di-Pertuan Agong and Timbalan Yang di-Pertuan Agong
- Fifth Schedule [Article 38(1)] – The Conference of Rulers
- Sixth Schedule [Articles 43(6), 43B(4), 57(1A)(a), 59(1), 124, 142(6)] – Forms of Oaths and Affirmations
- Seventh Schedule [Article 45] – Election of Senators
- Eighth Schedule [Article 71] – Provisions to be inserted in State Constitutions
- Ninth Schedule [Articles 74, 77] – Legislative Lists
- Tenth Schedule [Articles 109, 112C, 161C(3)*] – Grants and Sources of Revenue assigned to States
- Eleventh Schedule [Article 160(1)] – Provisions of the Interpretation and General Clauses Ordinance 1948 (Malayan Union Ordinance No. 7 of 1948), Applied for Interpretation of the Constitution
- Twelfth Schedule – Provisions of the Federation of Malaya Agreement, 1948 as Applied to the Legislative Council after Merdeka Day (Repealed)
- Thirteenth Schedule [Articles 113, 116, 117] – Provisions relating to delimitation of Constituencies

*NOTE—This Article was repealed by Act A354, section 46, in force from 27-08-1976—see section 46 of Act A354.

== Fundamental Liberties ==
Fundamental liberties in Malaysia are set out in Articles 5 to 13 of the Constitution, under the following headings: liberty of the person, prohibition of slavery and forced labour, protection against retrospective criminal laws and repeated trials, equality, prohibition of banishment and freedom of movement, freedom of speech, assembly and association, freedom of religion, rights in respect of education and rights to property. Some of these liberties and rights are subject to limitations and exceptions and some are available to citizens only (for example, the freedom of speech, assembly and association).

=== Article 5 – Right to Life and Liberty ===
Article 5 enshrines a number of basic fundamental human rights:

1. No person may be deprived of life or personal liberty except in accordance with law.
2. A person who is unlawfully detained may be released by the High Court (right of habeas corpus).
3. A person has the right to be informed of the reasons of his arrest and to be legally represented by a lawyer of his choice.
4. A person may not be arrested for more than 24 hours without a magistrate's permission.

=== Article 6 – No Slavery ===
Article 6 provides that no person may be held in slavery. All forms of forced labour are prohibited, but federal law, such as the National Service Act 1952, may provide for compulsory service for national purposes. It is expressly provided that work incidental to serving a sentence of imprisonment imposed by a court of law is not forced labour.

=== Article 7 – No Retrospective Criminal Laws or Increases in Punishment and no Repetition of Criminal Trials ===
In the area of criminal laws and procedure, this Article provides the following protections:

- No person shall be punished for an act or omission which was not punishable by law when it was done or made.
- No person shall suffer greater punishment for an offence than was prescribed by law at the time it was committed.
- A person who has been acquitted or convicted of an offence shall not be tried again for the same offence except where a retrial is ordered by a court.

=== Article 8 – Equality ===
Article 8 by clause (1) provides that all persons are equal before the law and entitled to its equal protection.

Clause 2 states: "Except as expressly authorised by this Constitution, there shall be no discrimination against citizens on the ground only of religion, race, descent, gender or place of birth in any law or in the appointment to any office or employment under a public authority or in the administration of any law relating to the acquisition, holding or disposition of property or the establishing or carrying on of any trade, business, profession, vocation or employment".

Clause 3 also states that no person shall be discriminated on the ground that he is a subject of a Ruler of a particular State.

The exceptions expressly allowed under the Constitution includes the affirmative actions taken to protect the special position for the Malays of Peninsular Malaysia and the indigenous people of Sabah and Sarawak under Article 153, and laws that provide for the protection, well-being or advancement of Orang Asli, residence requirement for election, and the enlistment of the Royal Malay Regiment.

=== Article 9 – Prohibition of Banishment and Freedom of Movement ===
This Article protects Malaysian citizens against being banished from the country. It further provides that every citizen has the right to move freely throughout the Federation but Parliament is allowed to impose restrictions on the movement of citizens from Peninsular Malaysia to Sabah and Sarawak.

=== Article 10 – Freedom of Speech, Assembly and Association ===
Article 10(1) grants freedom of speech, the right to assemble peaceably and the right to form associations to every Malaysian citizen but such freedom and rights are not absolute: the Constitution itself, by Article 10 (2), (3) and (4), expressly permits Parliament by law to impose restrictions in the interest of the security of the Federation, friendly relations with other countries, public order, morality, to protect the privileges of Parliament, to provide against contempt of court, defamation, or incitement to any offence.

Article 10 is a key provision of Part II of the Constitution, and has been regarded as "of paramount importance" by the judicial community in Malaysia. However, it has been argued that the rights of Part II, in particular Article 10, "have been so heavily qualified by other parts of the Constitution, for example, Part XI in relation to special and emergency powers, and the permanent state of emergency that has existed since 1969, that much of [the Constitution's] high principles are lost."

Article 10 (4) states that Parliament may pass law prohibiting the questioning of any matter, right, status, position, privilege, sovereignty or prerogative established or protected by the provisions of Part III, Article 152, 153 or 181 of the Constitution.

Several acts of law regulate the freedoms granted by Article 10, such as the Official Secrets Act, which makes it a crime to disseminate information classified as an official secret.

==== Laws on freedom of assembly ====
Under the Public Order (Preservation) Act 1958, the Home Minister may temporarily declare any area where public order is seriously disturbed or seriously threatened to be a "proclaimed area" for a period of up to one month. The police has extensive powers under the Act to maintain public order in proclaimed areas. These include the power to close roads, erect barriers, impose curfews, and to prohibit or regulate processions, meetings or assemblies of five persons or more. General offences under the Act are punishable by imprisonment for a term not exceeding six months; but for more serious offences, the maximum prison sentence is higher (e.g. 10 years for using offensive weapons or explosives) and sentences may include whipping.

Another law which previously curtailed the freedoms of Article 10 is Section 27 of the Police Act 1967, which criminalised the gathering of three or more people in a public place without a permit. However Section 27 of the Police Act dealing with such gatherings have been repealed by the Police (Amendment) Act 2012, which came into operation on 23 April 2012. The Peaceful Assembly Act 2012, which came into operation on the same day, replaced the Police Act as the principal legislation dealing with public gatherings.

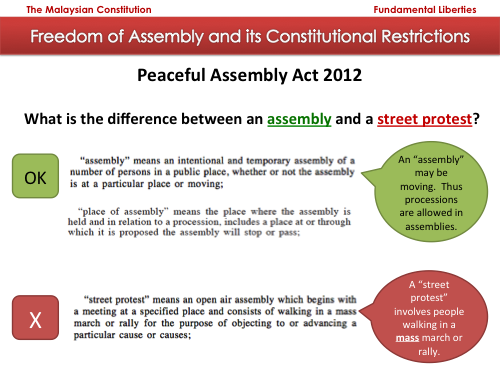
Diagram comparing assembly and street protests under the Act. Prohibition on street protests was aboslihed in 2019 by the Pakatan Harapan government which came into power after the 2018 general election.

===== Peaceful Assembly Act 2012 =====
The Peaceful Assembly Act gives citizens the right to organise and participate in peaceful assemblies subject to the restrictions under the Act. Under the law, citizens are allowed to hold assemblies, which includes processions (see the definition of "assembly" and "place of assembly" in section 3), upon giving 5 days notice to the police (section 9(1)). However, no notification is required for certain types of assemblies, such as wedding receptions, funeral processions, open houses during festivals, family gatherings, religious assemblies and assemblies at designated places of assembly (see section 9(2) and the Third Schedule).

Before 2019, street protests, which consist of "mass" marches or rallies, were not permitted (section 4(1)(c)). But this prohibition was abolished by the first Pakatan Harapan government through an amendment in 2019. The amendment also reduced the notification period from the previous 10 days to 5 days.

On 1 July 2025, the Federal Court ruled that section 9(5) of the Act, which punishes assembly organisers for failure to give 5 days' notice to the police, is unconstitutional for being inconsistent with Article 10 of the Constitution. This ruling in effect made it no longer required to submit a prior notice to the police before holding an assembly in Malaysia.

==== Laws on freedom of speech ====
The Printing Presses and Publications Act 1984 gives the Home Affairs Minister the discretion to grant, suspend and revoke newspaper publishing permits. Up until July 2012, the Minister could exercise "absolute discretion" on such matters, but this absolute discretionary power was expressly removed by the Printing Presses and Publications (Amendment) Act 2012. The Act also makes it a criminal offence to possess a printing press without a licence.

The Sedition Act 1948 makes it an offence to engage in acts with a "seditious tendency", including but not limited to the spoken word and publications. The meaning of "seditious tendency" is defined in section 3 of the Sedition Act 1948 and in substance it is similar to the English common law definition of sedition, with modifications to suit local circumstances. Conviction may result in a sentence of a fine up to RM5,000, three years in jail, or both.

The Sedition Act in particular has been widely commented upon by jurists for the bounds it places on freedom of speech. Justice Raja Azlan Shah (later the Yang di-Pertuan Agong) once said:

The right to free speech ceases at the point where it comes within the mischief of the Sedition Act.

Lord President Suffian in the case of PP v Mark Koding [1982] 2 MLJ 120 said, in relation to the amendments to Sedition Act in 1970, after 13 May 1969 riots, which added citizenship, language, special position of bumiputras and sovereignty of rulers to the list of seditious matters:

Malaysians with short memories and people living in mature and homogeneous democracies may wonder why in a democracy discussion of any issue and in Parliament of all places should be suppressed. Surely it might be said that it is better that grievances and problems about language, etc. should be openly debated, rather than be swept under the carpet and allowed to fester. But Malaysians who remember what happened during 13 May 1969, and subsequent days are sadly aware that racial feelings are only too easily stirred up by constant harping on sensitive issues like language and it is to minimise racial explosions that the amendments were made [to the Sedition Act].

==== Freedom of association ====
Article 10(c)(1) guarantees the freedom of association subject only to restrictions imposed through any federal law on the grounds of national security, public order or morality, or through any law relating to labour or education, or anti-party-switching provisions under the Constitution (Article 10(2)(c), (3) and (3A)).

In relation to the freedom of incumbent elected legislators to change their political parties, the Supreme Court of Malaysia in 1992 in Dewan Undangan Negeri Kelantan v Nordin Salleh [1992] 1 MLJ 697 held that an anti party-hopping provision in the Kelantan State Constitution violates the right to freedom of association. That provision stipulated that a member of the Kelantan State Legislative Assembly who is a member of any political party shall cease to be a member of the legislative assembly if he resigns or is expelled from such political party. The Supreme Court held that the Kelantan anti party-hopping provision was void because the "direct and inevitable consequence" of the provision is to restrict the right of members of the assembly from exercising their right to freedom of association. Furthermore, the Malaysian Federal Constitution sets out a complete list of the grounds on which a member of a State Legislative Assembly can be disqualified (e.g. being of unsound mind) and disqualification on the ground of resigning from one's political party is not one of them.

However, in 2022, following the 2020–2022 political crisis in Malaysia, Article 10 was amended by inserting a new Clause (3A) to allow anti party-hopping provisions be included in the Federal Constitution. Along with this, Article 49A was inserted to disqualify any Dewan Rakyat member who switched his political party membership while on office. Section 7A was also inserted into the Eighth Schedule of the Federal Constitution to mandate every State to impose similar restriction on state assemblymen in their State Constitutions.

=== Article 11 – Freedom of religion ===
Article 11 provides that every person has the right to profess and practice his own religion. Every person has the right to propagate his religion, but state law and, in respect of the Federal Territories, federal law may control or restrict the propagation of any religious doctrine or belief among Muslims. There is, however, freedom to carry on missionary work among non-Muslims.

=== Article 12 – Rights in respect to education ===
In respect to education, Article 12 provides that there shall be no discrimination against any citizen on the grounds of religion, race, descent or place of birth (i) in the administration of any educational institution maintained by a public authority, and, in particular, the admission of pupils or students or the payment of fees and (ii) in providing out of the funds of a public authority financial aid for the maintenance or education of pupils or students in any educational institution (whether or not maintained by a public authority and whether within or outside Malaysia). Note however that notwithstanding this Article, the Government is required, under Article 153, to implement affirmative action programs such as the reservation of places in tertiary educational institutions for the benefit of Malays and natives of Sabah and Sarawak.

In respect of religion, Article 12 provides that (i) every religious group has the right to establish and maintain institutions for the education of children in its own religion, and (ii) no person shall be required to receive instruction in or take part in any ceremony or act of worship of a religion other than his own and that for this purpose the religion of a person under the age of eighteen years shall be decided by his parent or guardian.

=== Article 13 – Rights to property ===
Article 13 provides that no person may be deprived of property save in accordance with law. No law may provide for the compulsory acquisition or use of property without adequate compensation.

== Federal and state relationship ==
=== Article 71 – State sovereignty and state constitutions ===
The Federation is required to guarantee the sovereignty of the Malay Sultans in their respective States. Each State, irrespective of whether it has a Sultan as its Ruler, has its own State constitution but for uniformity, all State constitutions must have a standard set of essential provisions (See Art. 71 and the 8th Schedule of the Federal Constitution.) These provide for:

- The establishment of a State Legislative Assembly, consisting of the ruler and democratically elected members, which sits for a maximum of five years.
- The appointment of an executive branch, called the Executive Council, by the Ruler from the members of the Assembly. The Ruler appoints as the head of the Executive Council (the Menteri Besar or Chief Minister) a person whom he believes is likely to command the confidence of the majority of the Assembly. The other members of the Executive Council are appointed by the Ruler on the advice of the Menteri Besar.
- The creation of a state level constitutional monarchy, as the ruler is required to act on the advice of the Executive Council on almost all matters under the State constitution and law
- The holding of a state general election upon the dissolution of the assembly.
- The requirements for amending state constitutions – two-thirds absolute majority of the members of the Assembly is required.

The Federal Parliament has the power to amend state constitutions if they do not contain the essential provisions or have provisions that are inconsistent with them. (Art. 71(4))

=== Articles 73 – 79 legislative powers ===
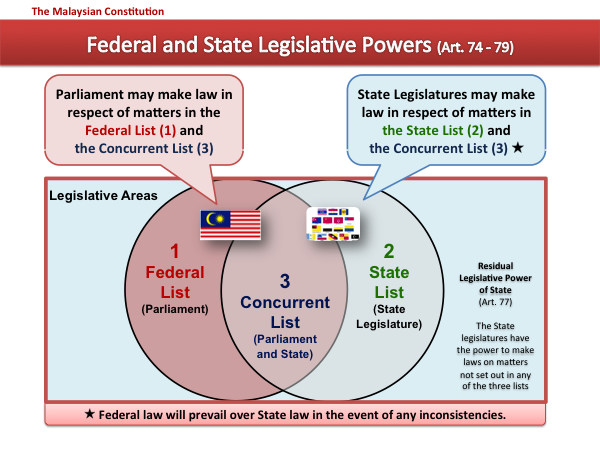
Diagram of Federal and State Legislative Powers

==== Federal, state and concurrent legislative lists ====
Parliament has the exclusive power to make laws over matters falling under the Federal List (such as citizenship, defence, internal security, civil and criminal law, finance, trade, commerce and industry, education, labour, and tourism) whereas each State, through its Legislative Assembly, has legislative power over matters under the State List (such as land, local government, Syariah law and Syariah courts, State holidays and State public works). Parliament and State legislatures share the power to make laws over matters under the Concurrent List (such as water supplies and housing) but Article 75 provides that in the event of conflict, Federal law will prevail over State law.

These lists are set out in Schedule 9 of the Constitution, where:

- The Federal List is set out in List I,
- The State List in List II, and
- The Concurrent List in List III.

There are supplements to the State List (List IIA) and the Concurrent List (List IIIA) that apply only to Sabah and Sarawak. These give the two states legislative powers over matters such as native law and customs, ports and harbours (other than those declared to be federal), hydro electricity and personal law relating to marriage, divorce, family law, gifts and intestacy.

Residual Power of States: The States have the residual power to make laws on any matter not listed in any of the three lists (Article 77).

Power of Parliament to make laws for States: Parliament is allowed to make laws on matters falling under the State List in certain limited cases, such as for the purposes of implementing an international treaty entered into by Malaysia or for the creation of uniform State laws. However, before any such law can be effective in a State, it must be ratified by law by its State Legislature. The only except is where the law passed by Parliament relates to land law (such as the registration of land titles and compulsory acquisition of land) and local government (Article 76).

==== State Islamic laws and Syariah courts ====
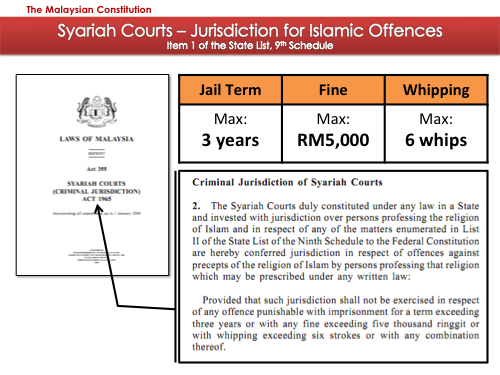
State Syariah Courts' jurisdiction for Islamic offences

States have legislative power over Islamic matters listed in item 1 of the State List which amongst other things includes the power to:

- Make Islamic laws and personal and family law of Muslims.
- Create and punish offences against precepts of Islam ("Islamic offences") which are committed by Muslims, except in regard to criminal law and other matters which fall under the Federal list.
- Create Syariah courts with jurisdiction over:
  1. Muslims only,
  2. Matters falling under Item 1 of the State List, and
  3. Islamic offences only if authority has been given by Federal law – and under the Syariah Courts (Criminal Jurisdiction) Act 1963, which is a Federal law, Syariah Courts were given the jurisdiction to try Islamic offences, but not if the offence is punishable by: (a) imprisonment of more than 3 years, (b) A fine exceeding RM5,000 or (c) Whipping in excess of six lashes, or any combination thereof.

== Other articles ==
=== Article 3 – Islam ===
Article 3 declares that Islam is the religion of the Federation but it then goes on to say that this does not affect the other provisions of the Constitution (Article 4(3)). Therefore, the fact that Islam is the religion of Malaysia does not by itself import Islamic principles into the Constitution but it does contain a number of specific Islamic features:

1. States may create their own laws to govern Muslims in respect of Islamic law and personal and family law matter.
2. States may create Syariah courts to adjudicate over Muslims in respect of State Islamic laws.
3. States may also create laws in relation to offences against precepts of Islam but this is subject to a number of limitations: (i) such laws may only apply to Muslim, (ii) such laws may not create criminal offences as only Parliament has the power to create criminal laws and (iii) the State Syariah Courts have no jurisdiction over Islamic offences unless allowed by federal law (see the above section).

=== Article 32 – The Head of State ===
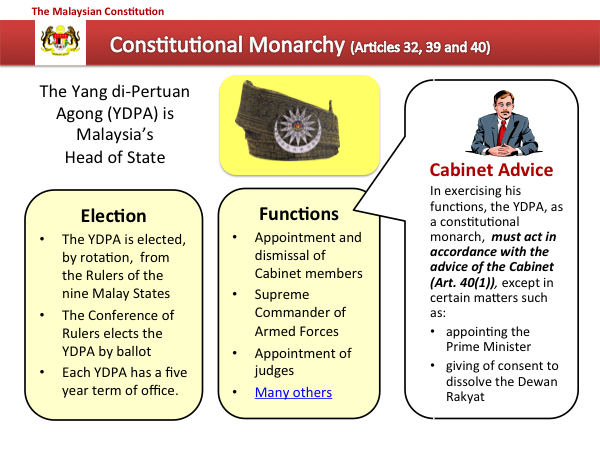
The Malaysian Head of State, the Yang di-Pertuan Agong, is a constitutional monarch.

Article 32 of the Constitution of Malaysia provides for a Supreme Head of the Federation or King of the Federation, to be called the Yang di-Pertuan Agong, who shall not be liable to any civil or criminal proceedings except in the Special Court. The Consort of the Yang di-Pertuan Agong is the Raja Permaisuri Agong.

The Yang di-Pertuan Agong is elected by the Conference of Rulers for a term of five years, but may at any time resign or be removed from office by the Conference of Rulers, and shall cease to hold office on ceasing to be a Ruler.

Article 33 provides for a Deputy Supreme Head of State or Deputy King, the Timbalan Yang di-Pertuan Agong, who acts as the Head of State when the Yang di-Pertuan Agong is expected to be unable to do so, owing to illness or absence from the country, for at least 15 days. The Timbalan Yang di-Pertuan Agong is also elected by the Conference of Rulers for a term of five-years or if elected during the reign of a Yang di-Pertuan Agong, until the end of his reign.

=== Articles 39 and 40 – The executive ===
Legally, executive power is vested in the Yang di-Pertuan Agong. Such power may be exercised by him personally only in accordance with Cabinet advice (except where the Constitution allows him to act in his own discretion)(Art. 40), the Cabinet, any minister authorised by the Cabinet, or any person authorised by federal law.

Article 40(2) allows the Yang di-Pertuan Agong to act in his own discretion in relation to the following functions: (a) The appointment of the Prime Minister, (b) The withholding of consent to a request to dissolve Parliament, and (c) The requisition of a meeting of the Conference of Rulers concerned solely with the privileges, position, honours and dignities of the Rulers.

=== Article 43 – Appointment of the Prime Minister and the cabinet ===
The Yang di-Pertuan Agong is required to appoint a Cabinet to advise him in the exercise of his executive functions. He appoints the Cabinet in the following manner:

- Acting in his discretion (see Art. 40(2)(a)), he first appoints as Prime Minister a member of the Dewan Rakyat who in his judgment is likely to command the confidence of the majority of the Dewan.
- On the advice of the Prime Minister, the Yang di-Pertuan Agong appoints other Ministers from among the members of either House of Parliament.

==== Article 43(4) – Cabinet and the loss of majority in the Dewan Rakyat ====
Article 43(4) stipulates that if the Prime Minister ceases to command the confidence of the majority of the members of the Dewan Rakyat, then unless at the PM's request the Yang di-Pertuan Agong dissolves Parliament (and the Yang di-Pertuan Agong may act in his absolute discretion (Art. 40(2)(b)) the PM and his Cabinet must resign.

Under Article 71 and the 8th Schedule, all State Constitutions are required to have a provision similar to the above in relation to their respective Menteri Besar (Chief Minister) and Executive Council (Exco).

==== The Perak Menteri Besar case ====
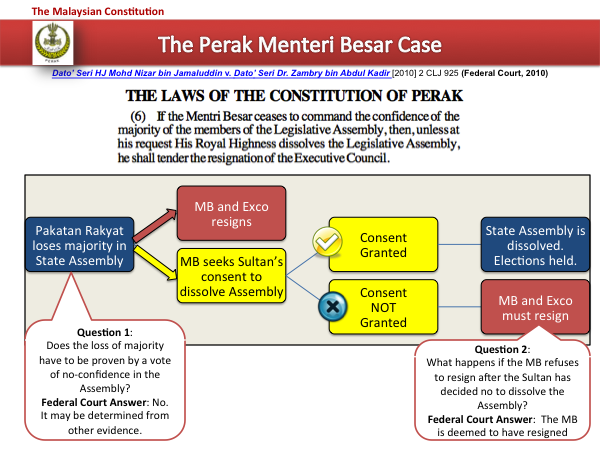
Diagram of the Perak Menteri Besar Case.

In 2009, the Federal Court had occasion to consider the application of this provision in the Perak State Constitution when the ruling coalition of the state (Pakatan Rakyat) lost the majority of the Perak Legislative Assembly due to floor crossings by several of their members to the opposition coalition (Barisan Nasional). Controversy arose in that incident because the then incumbent Menteri Besar was replaced by the Sultan with a member from Barisan Nasional without there having been a vote of no-confidence on the floor of the State Assembly against the then incumbent Menteri Besar, after he had unsuccessfully sought for the dissolution of the State Assembly. As noted above, the Sultan has complete discretion to decide whether or not to consent to the request to dissolve the assembly.

The Court held that (i) as the Perak State Constitution does not stipulate that the loss of confidence in a Menteri Besar can only be established through a vote in the assembly, then following the Privy Council's decision in Adegbenro v Akintola [1963] AC 614 and the High Court's decision in Dato Amir Kahar v Tun Mohd Said Keruak [1995] 1 CLJ 184, evidence of loss of confidence may be gathered from other sources and (ii) it is mandatory for a Menteri Besar to resign once he loses the confidence of the majority and if he refuses to do so then, following the decision in Dato Amir Kahar, he is deemed to have resigned.

=== Article 121 – The judiciary ===
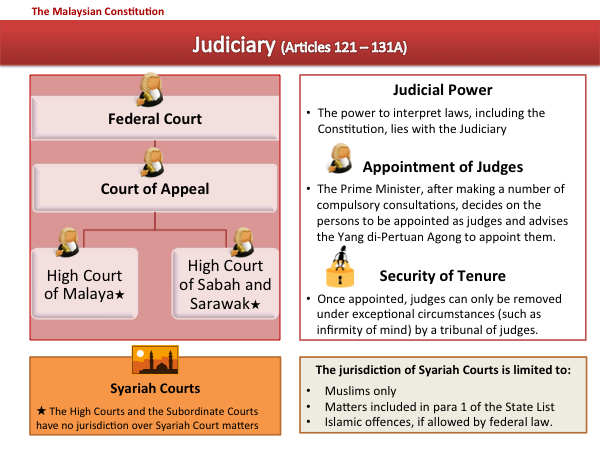
Diagram of Malaysian Civil and Syariah courts

The judicial power of Malaysia vests in the High Court of Malaya and the High Court of Sabah and Sarawak, the Court of Appeal and the Federal Court.

The two High Courts have jurisdiction over civil and criminal matters but have no jurisdiction "in respect of any matter within the jurisdiction of the Syariah courts." This exclusion of jurisdiction over Syariah matters is stipulated in Clause 1A of Article 121, which was added to the Constitution by Act A704, in force from 10 June 1988.

The Court of Appeal (Mahkamah Rayuan) has jurisdiction to hear appeals from decisions of the High Court and other matters as may be prescribed by law. (See Clause 1B of Article 121)

The highest court in Malaysia is the Federal Court (Mahkamah Persekutuan), which has jurisdiction to hear appeals from the Court of Appeal, the high courts, original or consultative jurisdictions under Articles 128 and 130 and such other jurisdiction as may be prescribed by law.

Separation of Powers

In July 2007, the Court of Appeal held that the doctrine of separation of powers was an integral part of the Constitution; under the Westminster System Malaysia inherited from the British, separation of powers was originally only loosely provided for. This decision was however overturned by the Federal Court, which held that the doctrine of separation of powers is a political doctrine, coined by the French political thinker Baron de Montesquieu, under which the legislative, executive and judicial branches of the government are kept entirely separate and distinct and that the Federal Constitution does have some features of this doctrine but not always (for example, Malaysian Ministers are both executives and legislators, which is inconsistent with the doctrine of separation of powers).

=== Article 149 – Special Laws against subversion and acts prejudicial to public order, such as terrorism ===
Article 149 gives power to the Parliament to pass special laws to stop or prevent any actual or threatened action by a large body of persons which Parliament believes to be prejudicial to public order, promoting hostility between races, causing disaffection against the State, causing citizens to fear organised violence against them or property, or prejudicial to the functioning of any public service or supply. Such laws do not have to be consistent with the fundamental liberties under Articles 5 (Right to Life and Personal Liberty), 9 (No Banishment from Malaysia and Freedom of movement within Malaysia), 10 (Freedom of Speech, Assembly and Association) or 13 (Rights to Property).

The laws passed under this article include the Internal Security Act 1960 (ISA) (which was repealed in 2012) and the Dangerous Drugs (Special Preventive Measures) Act 1985. Such Acts remain constitutional even if they provide for detention without trial. Some critics say that the repealed ISA had been used to detain people critical of the government. Its replacement the Security Offences (Special Measures) Act 2012 no longer allows for detention without trial but provides the police, in relation to security offences, with a number of special investigative and other powers such as the power to arrest suspects for an extended period of 28 days (section 4 of the Act), intercept communications (section 6), and monitor suspects using electronic monitoring devices (section 7).

Restrictions on preventive detention (Art. 151): Persons detained under preventive detention legislation have the following rights:

Grounds of Detention and Representations: The relevant authorities are required, as soon as possible, to tell the detainee why he or she is being detained and the allegations of facts on which the detention was made, so long as the disclosure of such facts are not against national security. The detainee has the right to make representations against the detention.

Advisory Board: If a representation is made by the detainee (and the detainee is a citizen), it will be considered by an advisory board which will then make recommendations to the Yang di-Pertuan Agong. This process must usually be completed within 3 months of the representations being received, but may be extended. The advisory board is appointed by the Yang di-Pertuan Agong. Its chairman must be a person who is a current or former judge of the High Court, Court of Appeal or the Federal Court (or its predecessor) or is qualified to be such a judge.

=== Article 150 – Emergency Powers ===
This article permits the Yang di-Pertuan Agong, acting on Cabinet advice, to issue a Proclamation of Emergency and to govern by issuing ordinances that are not subject to judicial review if the Yang di-Pertuan Agong is satisfied that a grave emergency exists whereby the security, or the economic life, or public order in the Federation or any part thereof is threatened.

Emergency ordinances have the same force as an Act of Parliament and they remain effective until they are revoked by the Yang di-Pertuan Agong or annulled by Parliament (Art. 150(2C)) and (3)). Such ordinances and emergency related Acts of Parliament are valid even if they are inconsistent with the Constitution except those constitutional provisions which relate to matters of Islamic law or custom of the Malays, native law or customs of Sabah and Sarawak, citizenship, religion or language. (Article 150(6) and (6A)).

Since Merdeka, four emergencies have been proclaimed, in 1964 (a nationwide emergency due to the Indonesia-Malaysia confrontation), 1966 (Sarawak only, due to the Stephen Kalong Ningkan political crisis), 1969 (nationwide emergency due to the 13 May riots) and 1977 (Kelantan only, due to a state political crisis).

All four Emergencies have now been revoked: the 1964 nationwide emergency was in effect revoked by the Privy Council when it held that the 1969 nationwide emergency proclamation had by implication revoked the 1964 emergency (see Teh Cheng Poh v P.P.) and the other three were revoked under Art. 150(3) of the Constitution by resolutions of the Dewan Rakyat and the Dewan Negara, in 2011.

=== Article 152 – National Language and Other Languages ===
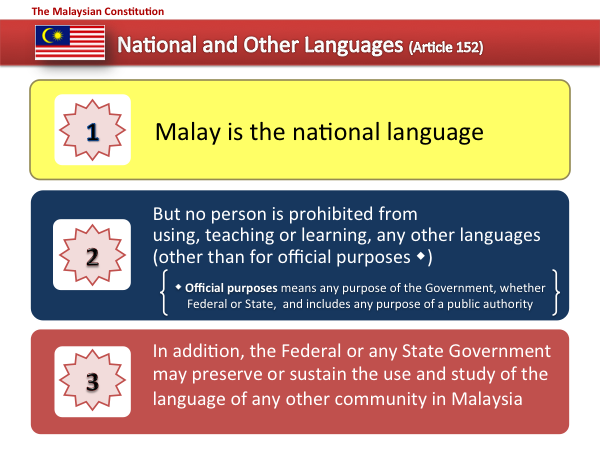
Diagram of national and other languages.

Article 152 states that the national language is the Malay language. In relation to other languages, the Constitution provides that:

(a) Everyone is free to teach, learn or use any other languages, except for official purposes. Official purposes here means any purpose of the Government, whether Federal or State, and includes any purpose of a public authority.

(b) The Federal and State Governments are free to preserve or sustain the use and study of the language of any other community.

Article 152(2) created a transition period for the continued use of English for legislative proceedings and all other official purposes. For the States in Peninsular Malaysia, the period was ten years from Merdeka Day and thereafter until Parliament provided otherwise. Parliament subsequently enacted the National Language Acts 1963/67 which provided that the Malay language shall be used for all official purposes. The Acts specifically provide that all court proceedings and parliamentary and state assembly proceedings are to be conducted in Malay, but exceptions may be granted by the judge of the court, or the Speaker or President of the legislative assembly.

The Acts also provide that the official script for the Malay language is the Latin alphabet or Rumi; however, use of Jawi is not prohibited.

=== Article 153 – Special Position of Bumiputras and Legitimate Interests of Other Communities ===
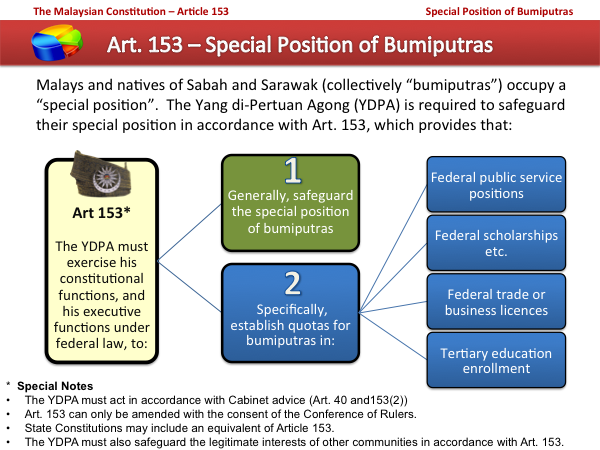
Article 153 entrenches the special position of Bumiputras

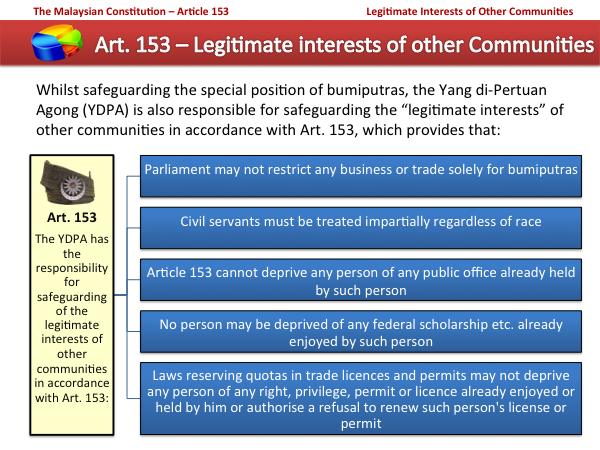
Article 153 also protects the legitimate interests of other communities

Article 153 stipulates that the Yang di-Pertuan Agong, acting on Cabinet advice, has the responsibility for safeguarding the special position of Malays and the indigenous peoples of Sabah and Sarawak, and the legitimate interests of all other communities.

Originally there was no reference made in the article to the indigenous peoples of Sabah and Sarawak, such as the Dusuns, Dayaks and Muruts, but with the union of Malaya with Singapore, Sabah and Sarawak in 1963, the Constitution was amended so as to provide similar privileges to them. The term Bumiputra is commonly used to refer collectively to Malays and the indigenous peoples of Sabah and Sarawak, but it is not defined in the constitution.

Article 153 in detail

Special position of bumiputras: In relation to the special position of bumiputras, Article 153 requires the King, acting on Cabinet advice, to exercise his functions under the Constitution and federal law:

(a) Generally, in such manner as may be necessary to safeguard the special position of the Bumiputras and

(b) Specifically, to reserve quotas for Bumiputras in the following areas:

1. Positions in the federal civil service.
2. Scholarships, exhibitions, and educational, training or special facilities.
3. Permits or licenses for any trade or business which is regulated by federal law (and the law itself may provide for such quotas).
4. Places in institutions of post secondary school learning such as universities, colleges and polytechnics.

Legitimate interests of other communities: Article 153 protects the legitimate interests of other communities in the following ways:

1. Citizenship to the Federation of Malaysia – originally was opposed by the Bumiputras during the formation of the Malayan Union and finally agreed upon due to pressure by the British
2. Civil servants must be treated impartially regardless of race – Clause 5 of Article 153 specifically reaffirms Article 136 of the Constitution which states: All persons of whatever race in the same grade in the service of the Federation shall, subject to the terms and conditions of their employment, be treated impartially.
3. Parliament may not restrict any business or trade solely for Bumiputras.
4. The exercise of the powers under Article 153 cannot deprive any person of any public office already held by him.
5. The exercise of the powers under Article 153 cannot deprive any person of any scholarship, exhibition or other educational or training privileges or special facilities already enjoyed by him.
6. While laws may reserve quotas for licences and permits for Bumiputras, they may not deprive any person of any right, privilege, permit or licence already enjoyed or held by him or authorise a refusal to renew such person's license or permit.

Article 153 may not be amended without the consent of the Conference of Rulers (See clause 5 of Article 159 (Amendment of the Constitution)). State Constitutions may include an equivalent of Article 153 (See clause 10 of Article 153).

The Reid Commission suggested that these provisions would be temporary in nature and be revisited in 15 years, and that a report should be presented to the appropriate legislature (currently the Parliament of Malaysia) and that the "legislature should then determine either to retain or to reduce any quota or to discontinue it entirely."

New Economic Policy (NEP): Under Article 153, and due to 13 May 1969 riots, the New Economic Policy was introduced. The NEP aimed to eradicate poverty irrespective of race by expanding the economic pie so that the Chinese share of the economy would not be reduced in absolute terms but only relatively. The aim was for the Malays to have a 30% equity share of the economy, as opposed to the 4% they held in 1970. Foreigners and Malaysians of Chinese descent held much of the rest.

The NEP appeared to be derived from Article 153 and could be viewed as being in line with its general wording. Although Article 153 would have been up for review in 1972, fifteen years after Malaysia's independence in 1957, due to the May 13 Incident it remained unreviewed. A new expiration date of 1991 for the NEP was set, twenty years after its implementation. However, the NEP was said to have failed to have met its targets and was continued under a new policy called the National Development Policy.

=== Article 154 – Federal Capital ===
Article 154(1) dictates that, the municipality of Kuala Lumpur shall be the federal capital of Malaysia, unless the Parliament otherwise determines another place in Malaysia to be the federal capital.

Since independence, the Parliament has never invoked its power under Clause (1) and officially move the federal capital away from Kuala Lumpur, even though majority of government ministries and agencies have relocated its headquarters to Putrajaya around 2003 and Putrajaya has become the administrative center of the federal government.

Clause (2) of this Article also states that only the Parliament has exclusive power to make laws to change or alter the boundaries of the federal capital.

=== Article 160 – Constitutional definition of Malay ===
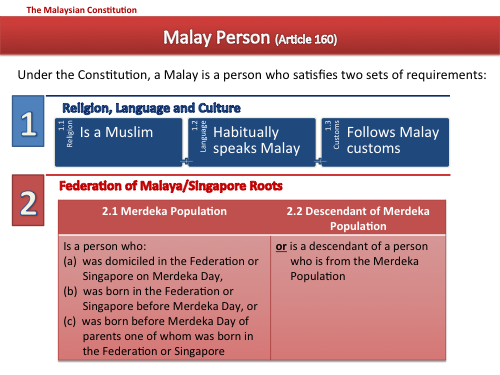
Diagram of the definition of Malay under the Constitution.

Article 160(2) of the Constitution of Malaysia defines various terms used in the Constitution, including "Malay," which is used in Article 153. "Malay" means a person who satisfies two sets of criteria:

First, the person must be one who professes to be a Muslim, habitually speaks the Malay language, and adheres to Malay customs.

Second, the person must have been:

(i)(a) Domiciled in the Federation or Singapore on Merdeka Day, (b) Born in the Federation or Singapore before Merdeka Day, or (c) Born before Merdeka Day of parents one of whom was born in the Federation or Singapore, (collectively, the "Merdeka Day population") or (ii) Is a descendant of a member of the Merdeka Day population.

As being a Muslim is one of the components of the definition, Malay citizens who convert out of Islam are no longer considered Malay under the Constitution. Hence, the Bumiputra privileges afforded to Malays under Article 153 of the Constitution of Malaysia, the New Economic Policy (NEP), etc. are forfeit for such converts. Likewise, a non-Malay Malaysian who converts to Islam can lay claim to Bumiputra privileges, provided he meets the other conditions. A higher education textbook conforming to the government Malaysian studies syllabus states: "This explains the fact that when a non-Malay embraces Islam, he is said to masuk Melayu (become a Malay). That person is automatically assumed to be fluent in the Malay language and to be living like a Malay as a result of his close association with the Malays."

Due to the requirement to have family roots in the Federation or Singapore, a person of Malay extract who has migrated to Malaysia after Merdeka day from another country (with the exception of Singapore), and their descendants, will not be regarded as a Malay under the Constitution as such a person and their descendants would not normally fall under or be descended from the Merdeka Day Population.

Sarawak: Malays from Sarawak are defined in the Constitution as part of the indigenous people of Sarawak (see the definition of the word "native" in clause 7 of Article 161A), separate from Malays of the Peninsular. Sabah: There is no equivalent definition for natives of Sabah which for the purposes of the Constitution are "a race indigenous to Sabah" (see clause 6 of Article 161A).

=== Article 181 – Sovereignty of the Malay Rulers ===
Article 181 guarantees the sovereignty, rights, powers and jurisdictions of each Malay Ruler within their respective states. They also cannot be charged in a court of law in their official capacities as a Ruler.

The Malay Rulers can be charged on any personal wrongdoing, outside of their role and duties as a Ruler. However, the charges cannot be carried out in a normal court of law, but in a Special Court established under Article 182.

Special Court for Proceedings against the Yang di-Pertuan Agong and the Rulers

The Special Court is the only place where both civil and criminal cases against the Yang di-Pertuan Agong and the Ruler of a State in his personal capacity may be heard. Such cases can only proceed with the consent of the Attorney General. The five members of the Special Court are (a) the Chief Justice of the Federal Court (who is the chairperson), (b) the two Chief Judges of the High Courts, and (c) two current or former judges to be appointed by the Conference of Rulers.

== Parliament ==
Malaysia's Parliament is a bicameral legislature constituted by the House of Representatives (Dewan Rakyat), the Senate (Dewan Negara) and the Yang di-Pertuan Agong (Art. 44).

The Dewan Rakyat is made up of 222 elected members (Art. 46). Each appointment will last until Parliament is dissolved for general elections. There are no limits on the number of times a person can be elected to the Dewan Rakyat.

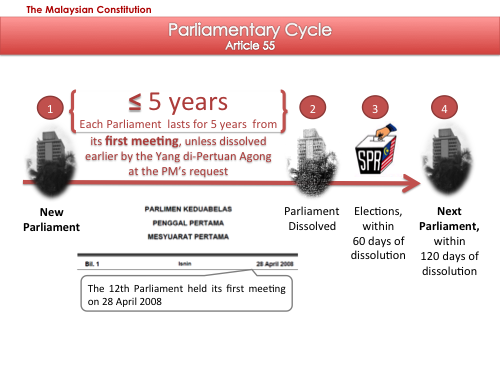
Timeline of the cycle of a Malaysian Parliament.

The Dewan Negara is made up of 70 appointed members. 44 are appointed by the Yang di-Pertuan Agong, on Cabinet advice, and the remainder are appointed by State Legislatures, which are each allowed to appoint 2 senators. Each appointment is for a fixed 3-year term which is not affected by a dissolution of Parliament. A person cannot be appointed as a senator for more than two terms (whether consecutive or not) and cannot simultaneously be a member of the Dewan Rakyat (and vice versa) (Art. 45).

All citizens meeting the minimum age requirement (21 for Dewan Rakyat and 30 for Dewan Negara) are qualified to be MPs or Senators (art. 47), unless disqualified under Article 48 (more below).

=== Parliamentary Cycle and General Elections ===
A new Parliament is convened after each general election (Art. 55(4)). The newly convened Parliament continues for five years from the date of its first meeting, unless it is sooner dissolved (Art. 55(3)). The Yang di-Pertuan Agong has the power to dissolve Parliament before the end of its five-year term (Art. 55(2)).

Once a standing Parliament is dissolved, a general election must be held within 60 days, and the next Parliament must have its first sitting within 120 days, from the date of dissolution (Art. 55(3) and (4)).

The 12th Parliament held its first meeting on 28 April 2008 and will be dissolved five years later, in April 2013, if it is not sooner dissolved.

=== Legislative power of Parliament and Legislative Process ===
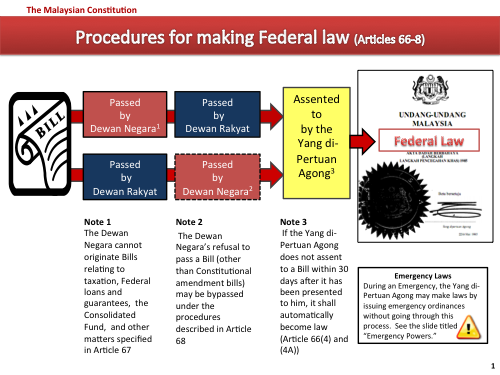
Diagram of Legislative Process.

Parliament has the exclusive power to make federal laws over matters falling under the Federal List and the power, which is shared with the State Legislatures, to make laws on matters in the Concurrent List (see the 9th Schedule of the Constitution).

With some exceptions, a law is made when a bill is passed by both houses and has received royal assent from the Yang di-Pertuan Agong, which is deemed given if the bill is not assented to within 30 days of presentation. The Dewan Rakyat's passage of a bill is not required if it is a money bill (which includes taxation bills). For all other bills passed by the Dewan Rakyat which are not Constitutional amendment bills, the Dewan Rakyat has the power to veto any amendments to bills made by the Dewan Negara and to override any defeat of such bills by the Dewan Negara.

The process requires that the Dewan Rakyat pass the bill a second time in the following Parliamentary session and, after it has been sent to Dewan Negara for a second time and failed to be passed by the Dewan Negara or passed with amendments that the Dewan Rakyat does not agree, the bill will nevertheless be sent for Royal assent (Art. 66–68), only with such amendments made by the Dewan Negara, if any, which the Dewan Rakyat agrees.

=== Qualifications for and Disqualification from Parliament ===
Article 47 states that every citizen who is 18 or older is qualified to be a member of the Dewan Rakyat and every citizen over 30 is qualified to be a senator in the Dewan Negara, unless in either case he or she is disqualified under one of the grounds set out in Article 48. These include unsoundness of mind, bankruptcy, acquisition of foreign citizenship or conviction for an offence and sentenced to imprisonment for a term of not less than one year or to a "fine of not less than two thousand ringgit".

Before 11 September 2019, the minimum age requirement to be a member of Dewan Rakyat was 21 years old instead of the current 18 years old requirement. This was changed after the Parliament passed a constitutional amendment in 2019 to lower both the minimum voting age and the minimum age to be a member of Dewan Rakyat or State Legislative Assembly to 18 years old.

== Citizenship ==
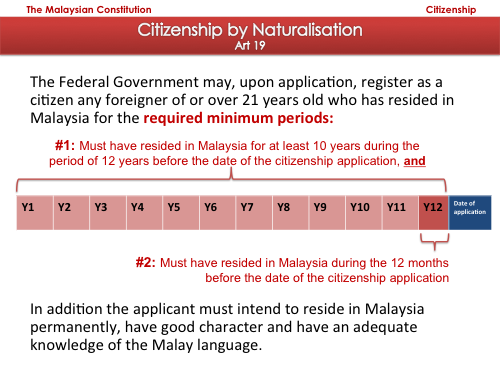
Diagram of the requirements for Malaysian citizenship by naturalisation.

Malaysian citizenship may be acquired in one of four ways:

1. By operation of law;
2. By registration;
3. By naturalisation;
4. By incorporation of territory (See Articles 14 – 28A and the Second Schedule).

=== Citizenship by operation of law ===
Citizenship by operation of law generally means the acquisition of citizenship which are automatically recognized by law, usually at birth, without additional vetting or requirements like those who acquire citizenship by registration or naturalisation. Citizenship by operation of law is also sometimes called "automatic citizenship".

The detailed qualifications for one to be citizen by operation of law are laid out in Part I and Part II of the Second Schedule. Part I of the Second Schedule applies to persons who were born before Malaysia Day (16 September 1963), while Part II applies to persons who were born after Malaysia Day.

==== Part I of the Second Schedule (Persons born before Malaysia Day) ====
Part I automatically recognised anyone who, immediately before Merdeka Day (31 August 1957), was a citizen of Malaya under the Federation of Malaya Agreement 1948, as a citizen by operation of law. Anyone who was born inside Malaya between 31 August 1957 and 30 September 1962 is also automatically recognised as citizen under this Part, regardless of his parents' citizenship status. However, starting from 1 October 1962, a person born inside Malaya will only be recognised as citizen by operation of law, if at least one of his parents is either a citizen or permanent resident at the time of birth of the said person, or the said person was not born a citizen of any other country.

For persons who were born overseas between Merdeka Day and Malaysia Day, his father must be a citizen at the time of the birth of the said person, and his father must also either be born within Malaya, or was in service with the government of Malaya at the time of birth of the said person. Other than that, person who were born overseas and whose his father is a citizen, must also within one year after the birth, register the birth with Malaysia's diplomatic missions; or if he was born in Singapore, Sarawak, Brunei, or North Borneo, register with the Federal Government.

Section 2 of Part I also recognised those who are ordinarily resident in Sabah, Sarawak, or Brunei on Malaysia Day and before that day is a citizen of United Kingdom and Colonies, who either was born in Sabah or Sarawak, or became a UK citizen by way of registration or naturalisation in those 3 territories, as a Malaysian citizen by operation of law.

==== Part II of the Second Schedule (Persons born on and after Malaysia Day) ====
Under Part II, every person who is born within Malaysia and at least one of his parents is a citizen or permanent resident at the time of birth of the said person, are citizen by operation of law. This pathway is how majority of Malaysian citizens acquire their citizenship.

For persons who are born overseas, his father must be a citizen at the time of birth, and his father must either be born in Malaysia, or at the time of the birth of the said person, is in service of the government of Malaysia. Persons who are born overseas to a Malaysian father must also have their birth register with a Malaysian diplomatic mission within one year after the birth of the said person; or if the person is born in Brunei, register with the Federal Government, in order for him to be a citizen by operation of law.

However, for persons who are born in Singapore, at least one of his parents (not limited to father) must be a citizen at the time of birth in order for the person to be recognised a citizen by operation of law, and it does not require the birth to be register at a Malaysia diplomatic mission.

Paragraph (e), section 1 of this Part also recognises that anyone who is born inside Malaysia and within one year after his birth is not born a citizen of any country otherwise than by virtue of this paragraph, is a citizen by operation of law.

==== Inapplication to children of foreign diplomats ====
For persons who are born inside Malaysia, either before or after Malaysia Day, if his father is a foreign diplomat, or enjoys dilpomatic immunity, then such persons are not entitled to citizenship by operation of law.

=== Citizenship by naturalisation ===
The requirements for citizenship by naturalisation, which are relevant to foreigners who wish to become Malaysian citizens, stipulate that an applicant must be at least 21 years old, intend to reside permanently in Malaysia, have good character, have an adequate knowledge of the Malay language, and meet a minimum period of residence in Malaysia: he or she must have been resident in Malaysia for at least 10 years out of the last 12 years, as well as the immediate 12 months, before the date of the citizenship application (Art. 19). The Malaysian Government retains the discretion to decide whether or not to approve any such applications.

Malaysia is one of 25 countries that did not give mothers and fathers equal rights under the country's citizenship law. In September 2021, the Kuala Lumpur High Court ruled in favour of family support group Family Frontier's petition that Malaysian mothers have the right to pass their citizenship to their children born overseas – a privilege previously only granted to fathers. The change helps ease access to residency, education and healthcare for families. It was hailed by activists as a giant step toward gender equality. On 17 February 2023, the Anwar Ibrahim Cabinet confirmed that it would amend the Constitution to enable children born overseas to Malaysian mothers, who are married to foreigners, to obtain Malaysian citizenship automatically. Legislation amending the constitution is expected to be introduced in 2023.

== Election Commission ==
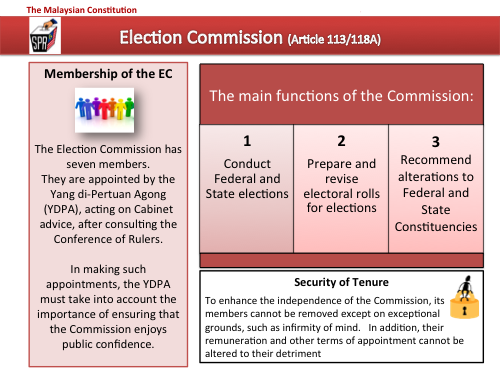
Diagram of the Malaysian Election Commission's composition, functions and independent features.

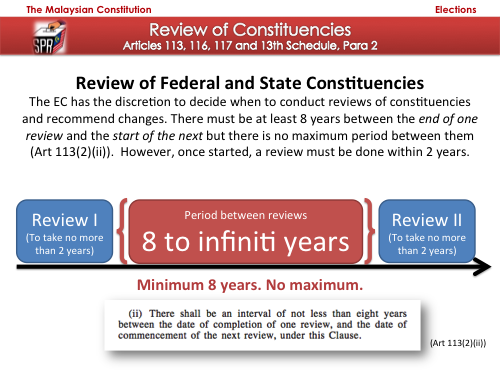
Diagram showing the time table for review of federal and state constituencies by the Election Commission of Malaysia.

The Constitution establishes an Election Commission (EC) which has the duty of preparing and revising the electoral rolls and conducting the Dewan Rakyat and State Legislative Council elections...

Appointment of EC Members

All 7 members of the EC are appointed by the Yang di-Pertuan Agong (acting on the advice of the Cabinet), after consulting the Conference of Rulers.

Steps to enhance the EC's Independence

To enhance the independence of the EC, the Constitution provides that:

1. The Yang di-Pertuan Agong shall have regard to the importance of securing an EC that enjoys public confidence when he appoints members of the commission (Art. 114(2)),
2. The members of the EC cannot be removed from office except on the grounds and in the same manner as those for removing a Federal Court judge (Art. 114(3)) and
3. The remuneration and other terms of office of a member of the EC cannot be altered to his or her disadvantage (Art. 114(6)).

Review of Constituencies

The EC is also required to review the division of Federal and State constituencies and recommend changes in order that the constituencies comply with the provisions of the 13th Schedule on the delimitation of constituencies (Art. 113(2)).

Timetable for review of Constituencies

The EC can itself determine when such reviews are to be conducted but there must be an interval of at least 8 years between reviews but there is no maximum period between reviews (see Art. 113(2)(ii), which states that "There shall be an interval of not less than eight years between the date of completion of one review, and the date of commencement of the next review, under this Clause.")

== Constitutional amendments ==
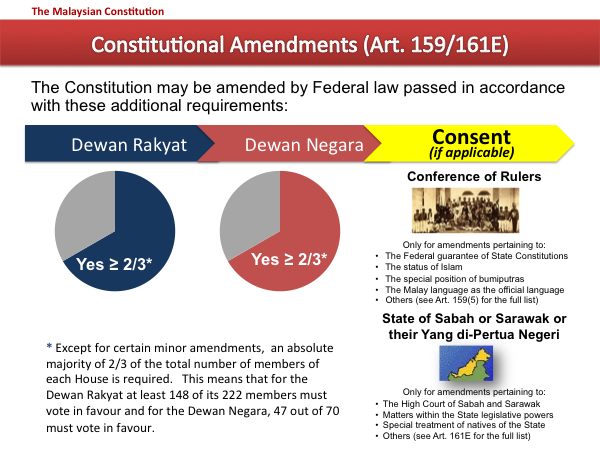
Diagram of Constitutional Amendments

The Constitution itself provides by Articles 159 and 161E how it may be amended (it may be amended by federal law), and in brief there are four ways by which it may be amended:

1. Some provisions may be amended only by a two-thirds absolute majority in each House of Parliament but only if the Conference of Rulers consents. These include:
  - Amendments pertaining to the powers of sultans and their respective states
  - The status of Islam in the Federation
  - The special position of the Malays and the natives of Sabah and Sarawak
  - The status of the Malay language as the official language
2. Some provisions of special interest to East Malaysia, may be amended by a two-thirds absolute majority in each House of Parliament but only if the Governor of the East Malaysian state concurs. These include:
  - Citizenship of persons born before Malaysia Day
  - The constitution and jurisdiction of the High Court of Borneo
  - The matters with respect to which the legislature of the state may or may not make laws, the executive authority of the state in those matters and financial arrangement between the Federal government and the state.
  - Special treatment of natives of the state
3. Subject to the exception described in item four below, all other provisions may be amended by a two-thirds absolute majority in each House of Parliament, and these amendments do not require the consent of anybody outside Parliament.
4. Certain types of consequential amendments and amendments to three schedules may be made by a simple majority in Parliament.

=== Two-thirds absolute majority requirement ===
Where a two-thirds absolute majority is required, this means that the relevant Constitutional amendment bill must be passed in each House of Parliament "by the votes of not less than two-thirds of the total number of members of that House" (Art. 159(3)). Thus, for the Dewan Rakyat, the minimum number of votes required is 148, being two-thirds of its 222 members.

Effect of MP suspensions on the two-thirds majority requirement

In December 2010, a number of MPs from the opposition were temporarily suspended from attending the proceedings of the Dewan Rakyat and this led to some discussions as to whether their suspension meant that the number of votes required for the two-thirds majority was reduced to the effect that the ruling party regained the majority to amend the Constitution. From a reading of the relevant Article (Art. 148), it would appear that the temporary suspension of some members of the Dewan Rakyat from attending its proceedings does not lower the number of votes required for amending the Constitution as the suspended members are still members of the Dewan Rakyat: as the total number of members of the Dewan Rakyat remains the same even if some of its members may be temporarily prohibited to attending its proceedings, the number of votes required to amend the Constitution should also remain the same – 148 out of 222. In short, the suspensions gave no such advantage to the ruling party.

=== Frequency of Constitutional Amendments ===
According to constitutional scholar Shad Saleem Faruqi, the Constitution has been amended 22 times over the 48 years since independence as of 2005. However, as several amendments were made each time, he estimates the true number of individual amendments is around 650. He has stated that "there is no doubt" that "the spirit of the original document has been diluted". This sentiment has been echoed by other legal scholars, who argue that important parts of the original Constitution, such as jus soli (right of birth) citizenship, a limitation on the variation of the number of electors in constituencies, and Parliamentary control of emergency powers have been so modified or altered by amendments that "the present Federal Constitution bears only a superficial resemblance to its original model". It has been estimated that between 1957 and 2003, "almost thirty articles have been added and repealed" as a consequence of the frequent amendments.

However another constitutional scholar, Prof. Abdul Aziz Bari, takes a different view. In his book "The Malaysian Constitution: A Critical Introduction" he said that "Admittedly, whether the frequency of amendments is necessarily a bad thing is difficult to say", because "Amendments are something that are difficult to avoid especially if a constitution is more of a working document than a brief statement of principles".

Technical versus Fundamental Amendments

Taking into account the contrasting views of the two Constitutional scholars, it is submitted that for an informed debate about whether the frequency and number of amendments represent a systematic legislative disregard of the spirit of the Constitution, one must distinguish between changes that are technical and those that are fundamental and be aware that the Malaysian Constitution is a much longer document than other constitutions that it is often benchmarked against for number of amendments made. For example, the US Constitution has less than five thousand words whereas the Malaysian Constitution with its many schedules contains more than 60,000 words, making it more than 12 times longer than the US constitution. This is so because the Malaysian Constitution lays downs very detailed provisions governing micro issues such as revenue from toddy shops, the number of High Court judges and the amount of federal grants to states. It is not surprising therefore that over the decades changes needed to be made to keep pace with the growth of the nation and changing circumstance, such as increasing the number of judges (due to growth in population and economic activity) and the amount of federal capitation grants to each State (due to inflation). For example, on capitation grants alone, the Constitution has been amended on three occasions, in 1977, 1993 and most recently in 2002, to increase federal capitation grants to the States.

Furthermore, a very substantial number of amendments were necessitated by territorial changes such as the admission of Singapore, Sabah and Sarawak, which required a total of 118 individual amendments (via the Malaysia Act 1963) and the creation of Federal Territories. All in all, the actual number of Constitutional amendments that touched on fundamental issues is only a small fraction of the total.

== See also ==
- 1988 Malaysian constitutional crisis
- History of Malaysia
- Law of Malaysia
- Politics of Malaysia
- Federation of Malaya
- Malaysia Agreement
- Malaysia Bill (1963)
- Malaysian General Election
- Reid Commission
- Status of religious freedom in Malaysia

== Notes ==
Books

- Mahathir Mohammad, The Malay Dilemma, 1970.
- Mohamed Suffian Hashim, An Introduction to the Constitution of Malaysia, second edition, Kuala Lumpur: Government Printers, 1976.
- Rehman Rashid, A Malaysian Journey, Petaling Jaya, 1994
- Sheridan & Groves, The Constitution of Malaysia, 5th Edition, by KC Vohrah, Philip TN Koh and Peter SW Ling, LexisNexis, 2004
- Andrew Harding and H.P. Lee, editors, Constitutional Landmarks in Malaysia – The First 50 Years 1957 – 2007, LexisNexis, 2007
- Shad Saleem Faruqi, Document of Destiny – The Constitution of the Federation of Malaysia, Shah Alam, Star Publications, 2008
- JC Fong,Constitutional Federalism in Malaysia, Sweet & Maxwell Asia, 2008
- Abdul Aziz Bari and Farid Sufian Shuaib, Constitution of Malaysia – Text and Commentary, Pearson Malaysia, 2009
- Kevin YL Tan & Thio Li-ann, Constitutional Law in Malaysia and Singapore, Third Edition, LexisNexis, 2010
- Andrew Harding, The Constitution of Malaysia – A Contextual Analysis, Hart Publishing, 2012

Historical Documents

- Report of the Federation of Malaya Constitutional Conference held in London in 1956
- Report of the Federation of Malaya Constitutional Commission 1957 (The Reid Commission Report)
- Agreement relating to Malaysia signed on 9 July 1963 between the United Kingdom of Great Britain and Northern Ireland, the Federation of Malaya, North Borneo, Sarawak and Singapore (Malaysia Agreement)

Websites

- An Introduction to the Malaysian Constitution

Constitution

- Federal Constitution of Malaysia (Reprint – As at 15 October 2020)

Legislation

- Syariah Courts (Criminal Jurisdiction) Act 1963
- Peaceful Assembly Act 2012
- Security Offences (Special Measures) Act 2012
