= Sarawak Sovereignty Movement =

Civil movement in Sarawak, Malaysia

- Logo of the Sarawak Sovereignty Movement

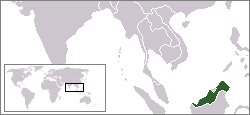
- Abbreviation: SSM
- Formation: April 13, 2013; 13 years ago
- Type: NGO
- Legal status: Civil Movement
- Headquarters: Kuching
- Location: Borneo
- Coordinates: 34.3670317°N 89.5334458°W
- Region served: Worldwide
- Budget: RM (Cash) none
- Website: Sarawak Sovereignty Movement
- Formerly called: none

The Sarawak Sovereignty Movement or SSM is an civil movement which was officially launched in Kuching, Sarawak on 13 April 2013. It has described itself as apolitical.

Sarawak Sovereignty Movement spokesman Dato Morshidi Abdul Rahman said in 2013 that the people had "had enough of the lop-sided development between the peninsula and Sarawak", and that something needed to be done about it. He explained, "We are a civil movement and apolitical. We are not militants or extremists. Sarawak is one of the partners that form Malaysia. The others are Malaya and Sabah. We just want equality of all Sarawakians regardless of their races."

The movement believes that the terms and conditions for the formation of Malaysia gave Sarawak, North Borneo, Malaya, and Singapore the status of equal partners in the newly formed Malaysia, in 1963.

== Activities ==
The Sarawak Sovereignty Movement and Borneo Heritage Foundation have co-operated in a series of Sarawak and Sabah Merdeka celebrations. The organisation was also present and involved with various carnivals and events intended to celebrate Malaysia Day in 2013.

== See also ==
- Malaysia Agreement
- Malaysia Act 1963
- North Borneo Federation
- 18-point agreement
- 20-point agreement
- Kuching Declaration
