= SSM =

SSM may refer to:

== Arts and entertainment ==
- Sakıp Sabancı Museum, an art museum in Istanbul, Turkey
- SSM (band), a post punk/garage/psych rock band from Detroit, Michigan, formed in 2005

== Organizations ==
- Companies Commission of Malaysia (Suruhanjaya Syarikat Malaysia)
- Federation of Trade Unions of Macedonia (Сојуз на синдикатите на Македонија)
- Georgian Public Broadcasting (Sakartvelos Sazogadoebrivi Mauts'q'ebeli)
- Sarawak Sovereignty Movement, Kuching, Sarawak, Malaysia
- Scuola Svizzera di Milano, a Swiss international school in Milan, Italy
- Shattuck-Saint Mary's, a coeducational Episcopal-affiliated boarding school in Faribault, Minnesota, US
- Socialist Struggle Movement (SSM), a socialist organization in Israel–Palestine
- Socialist Union of Youth (Socialistický svaz mládeže), an organization in the former Czechoslovakia
- SSM Health, St. Louis, Missouri, US
- Society for Social Medicine, UK
- Society of the Sacred Mission, an Anglican religious order
- Society of Saint Margaret, an Anglican religious order
- Swedish Radiation Safety Authority (Strålsäkerhetsmyndigheten)

== Computing ==
- Silicon secured memory, SPARC encryption technology
- Source-specific multicast, in computer networking
- Standard shadow map, in computer graphics

== Medicine ==
- Ssm6a, Scolopendra subspinipes mutilans 6, or μ-SLPTX-Ssm6a, is a toxin from the venom of the Chinese red-headed centipede.
- SSMEM1, Serine-rich single-pass membrane protein 1 is a protein that in humans is encoded by the SSMEM1 gene.
- Sleep state misperception, a term used to classify sleep disorders
- Slipped strand mispairing, a mutation process during DNA replication
- Social Science & Medicine, a peer-reviewed journal
- Special study module, now student selected component, an option in medical schools in the UK
- Superficial spreading melanoma, a type of cancer
- System status management, of emergency medical services

== Other science and technology ==
- Scanning SQUID microscope, a magnetic current imaging system
- Semi-solid metal casting, in the production of aluminium or magnesium parts
- Special sensor microwave/imager, is a seven-channel, four-frequency, linearly polarized passive microwave radiometer system
- Spectral submanifold, a type of invariant manifold in nonlinear dynamical systems
- Standard solar model, a mathematical treatment of the Sun as a spherical ball of gas in cosmology
- Startup, shutdowns, and malfunctions, in potentially polluting industrial plants

== Military appointments and decorations ==
- Grand Commander of the Order of Loyalty to the Crown of Malaysia
- Special Service Medal (Canada), awarded to members of the Canadian Forces
- Squadron sergeant major, in some Commonwealth armies
- Staff sergeant major, in some Commonwealth armies

== Weaponry ==
- Ship-to-ship missile
- Surface-to-ship missile
- Surface-to-surface missile

== Other uses ==
- Honda SSM, a concept car introduced at the 1995 Tokyo Motor Show
- ASEAN MRT station, a rapid transit station in Jakarta, Indonesia, formerly named Sisimangaraja
- Sam Schmidt Motorsports, an auto racing team
- Sault Ste. Marie Municipal Airport, IATA code
- Self-supporting minister, an unpaid priest in the Church of England and Church of Ireland
- Single Supervisory Mechanism, also known as European Banking Supervision, a system centered on the European Central Bank for the prudential supervision of banks in the euro area
- Special Safeguard Mechanism, a World Trade Organization tool that allows developing countries to raise tariffs temporarily to deal with import surges or price falls
- Strategic service management, optimization of a company's post-sale service
- Soft systems methodology, a problem-solving method
- Same-sex marriage, a marriage between two people of the same legal sex
