= Malaysia Act =

Malaysia Act or The Malaysia Act may refer to:

- The Malaysia Act 1963 (1963 C 35) an Act of Parliament in the United Kingdom.
- The Malaysia Bill (1963) cite as Malaysia Act, 1963 is an annex of the Agreement relating to Malaysia between United Kingdom of Great Britain and Northern Ireland, Federation of Malaya, North Borneo, Sarawak and Singapore known as Malaysia Agreement.
