= Peninsular Malaysia =

Western, mainland part of Malaysia

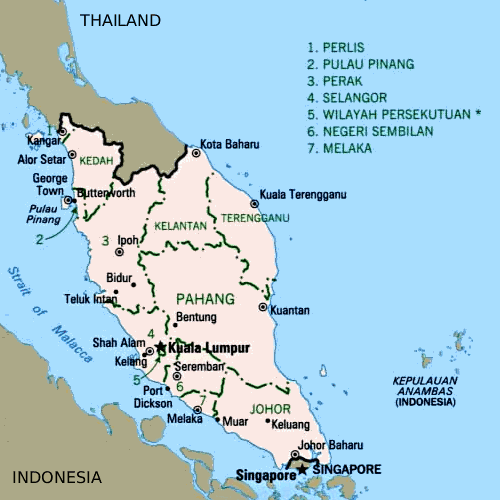
Map of Peninsular Malaysia

Peninsular Malaysia, (Note: Malay: Semenanjung Malaysia) historically known as Peninsular Malaya or simply Malaya prior to 1963, (Note: Malay: Tanah Melayu) and also known as West Malaysia and the Malaysian Peninsula, (Note: In physical geography, the term "Malaysian Peninsula" refers to the southern part of the Malay Peninsula, which contains territories of Malaysia, Myanmar, and Thailand.) is the southern part of the Malay Peninsula in Mainland Southeast Asia along with the nearby islands that are part of Malaysia. Its area totals approximately 131,956 km^{2} (50,948 sq mi). It makes up nearly 40% of the total area of Malaysia; the other 60% is on the island of Borneo, also known as East Malaysia.

The present-day land border with Thailand to the north originates from the Anglo–Siamese Treaty of 1909, while a maritime border with Singapore to the south was established following the independence of Singapore in 1965. To the west, across the Strait of Malacca, lies the island of Sumatra, and to the east, across the South China Sea, lie the Natuna Islands, both part of Indonesia. At its southern tip, across the Strait of Johor, lies the island country of Singapore. Most of Peninsular Malaysia's interior is forested, mountainous and rural, while the majority of the population and economic activity are concentrated along the coastal western half, where the country's major urban centres are located.

== States and federal territories ==
Peninsular Malaysia encompasses 11 out of the 13 states, and two out of the three federal territories of Malaysia, which includes the national capital of Kuala Lumpur. The states are listed as the following:

Flag	Emblem / Achievement	State	Capital	Royal Capital	Area (km²)	Office of Head of State	Current Head of Government
Flag of Johor	Coat of arms of Johor	Johor	Johor Bahru	Muar	19,166	Sultan	Menteri Besar
Flag of Kedah	Coat of arms of Kedah	Kedah	Alor Setar	Anak Bukit	9,492	Sultan	Menteri Besar
Flag of Kelantan	Coat of arms of Kelantan	Kelantan	Kota Bharu	Kubang Kerian	15,040	Sultan	Menteri Besar
Flag of Malacca	Coat of arms of Malacca	Malacca	Malacca City	—	1,712	Yang di-Pertua Negeri (Governor)	Chief Minister
Flag of Negeri Sembilan	Coat of arms of Negeri Sembilan	Negeri Sembilan	Seremban	Seri Menanti	6,658	Yang di-Pertuan Besar (Grand Ruler)	Menteri Besar
Flag of Pahang	Coat of arms of Pahang	Pahang	Kuantan	Pekan	35,965	Sultan	Menteri Besar
Flag of Penang	Coat of arms of Penang	Penang	George Town	—	1,049	Yang di-Pertua Negeri (Governor)	Chief Minister
Flag of Perak	Coat of arms of Perak	Perak	Ipoh	Kuala Kangsar	21,146	Sultan	Menteri Besar
Flag of Perlis	Coat of arms of Perlis	Perlis	Kangar	Arau	819	Raja	Menteri Besar
Flag of Selangor	Coat of arms of Selangor	Selangor^{*}	Shah Alam	Klang	7,951	Sultan	Menteri Besar
Flag of Terengganu	Coat of arms of Terengganu	Terengganu	Kuala Terengganu	Kuala Terengganu	12,958	Sultan	Menteri Besar

^{*}Two federal territories are embedded within Selangor, which are Kuala Lumpur and Putrajaya.

== Etymology ==
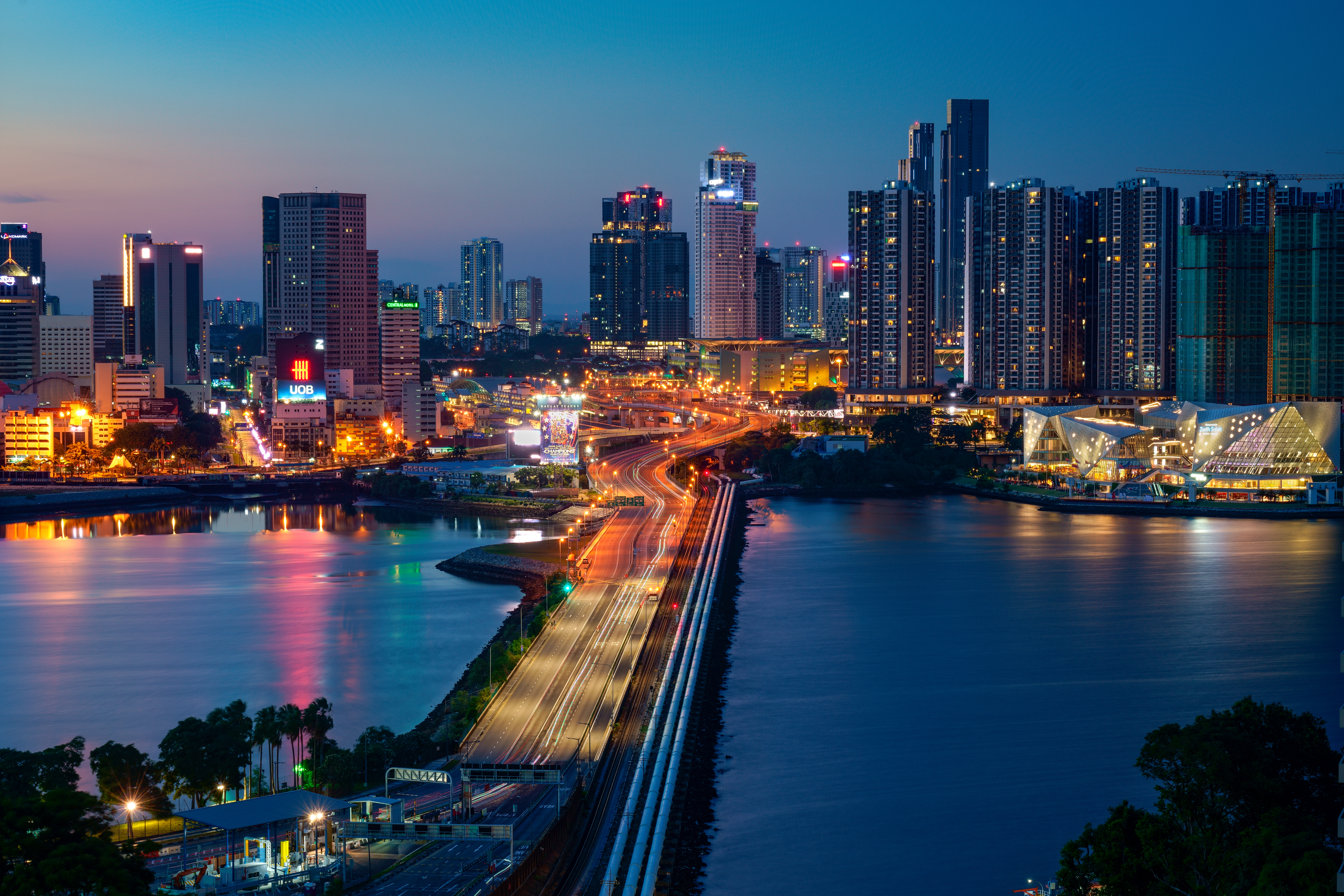
Johor–Singapore Causeway and Johor Bahru skyline at the Southern tip of Peninsular Malaysia.

Originally comprising the states and territories of the Federation of Malaya, the then Federation under the Malaysia Agreement merged with the Crown Colony of North Borneo, the Crown Colony of Sarawak and the self-governing State of Singapore to form the new Federation called Malaysia. The merger was initially proposed in order to reunify Singapore with its hinterland in the Federation as they were originally associated under British Malaya but later separated and were governed separately after the formation of the Malayan Union. Even when the Malayan Union transformed into the Federation of Malaya, Singapore was not a part of it. Although politically distinct, Malaya was then seen geographically as comprising the States of the Federation of Malaya in the Peninsula and Singapore. In order to facilitate the merger, the Borneo States (which initially also included Brunei) were brought in as well as it was believed that with the inclusion of the various ethnic groups in Borneo, the racial arithmetic would be offset such that the influx of ethnic Chinese from Singapore would not politically overwhelm Malaya, satisfying the Malay ultras.

Ultimately, both Malaysia and Singapore agreed that after the merger, Singapore would retain autonomy in labor, education, and health, among others, a status distinct from the other states in the Federation of Malaya. In exchange, Singapore accepted an underproportioned representation in the Dewan Rakyat. As envisioned by Malaysian prime minister Tunku Abdul Rahman, Singapore's position within Malaysia was seen as a special, autonomous status similar to Northern Ireland in the United Kingdom rather than being grouped with the non-autonomous states of the Peninsula. Although this arrangement was brief and Singapore was ultimately expelled from the Federation two years later in 1965, becoming a fully sovereign country, the Interpretation Act 1965 of the Parliament of Singapore still defines Malaya as comprising the States of Malaya and Singapore in a strictly geographical sense. Today, the States of Malaya are colloquially referred to as Peninsular Malaysia and West Malaysia, excluding the Borneo States and Singapore. The term should also not be confused with the Malay Peninsula, which includes lands that are a part of Myanmar and Thailand.

== Terminology ==
- Peninsular Malaysia (States of Malaya) comprises the states of Johor, Kedah, Kelantan, Malacca, Negeri Sembilan, Pahang, Penang, Perak, Perlis, Selangor, and Terengganu, as well as the federal territories of Kuala Lumpur and Putrajaya.
- Malaya comprises Peninsular Malaysia and the Republic of Singapore.
- Malay Peninsula comprises the southern tip of Myanmar, Peninsular Malaysia, and Southern Thailand.

== Demographics ==
Ethnicity in Peninsular Malaysia (2020)
1. Bumiputera (Malay) (66.0%)
2. Chinese (24.0%)
3. Indian (9.00%)
4. Indigenous (Aslian) / Non-Malay Bumiputera (0.30%)
5. Others (0.70%)

Religion in Peninsular Malaysia – 2020 est.
Religion	Percent
Islam	67%
Buddhism	21.4%
Hinduism	7.6%
Christianity	3.2%
Chinese folk religion	0.9%
Others	1.7%

Peninsular Malaysia is largely inhabited by ethnic Malays, predominantly Muslims at about 65–67%. However, large Chinese and Indian populations exist. The Orang Asli are the indigenous people of Peninsular Malaysia; in 2022, they numbered around 209,575 and mostly lived in inland and rural parts of the region.

== Economy ==
As of 2012, Peninsular Malaysia oil production stood at 520,000 barrel of oil equivalent per day.

== Other features ==
=== East Coast and West Coast ===
The term East Coast (Malay: Pantai Timur; Jawi: ڤنتاي تيمور) is particularly used in Malaysia to describe the following states in Peninsular Malaysia facing the South China Sea, a marginal sea of the Pacific Ocean:

- Kelantan
- Pahang
- Terengganu

The term West Coast (Malay: Pantai Barat; Jawi: ڤنتاي بارت) refers informally to a collection of states in Peninsular Malaysia situated towards the western coast generally facing the Strait of Malacca which is a component of the Indian Ocean, as opposed to the East Coast. The West Coast is partitioned further into three regions:

- Central Region
  - Kuala Lumpur (federal territory)
  - Putrajaya (federal territory)
  - Selangor
- Northern Region
  - Kedah
  - Penang
  - Perak
  - Perlis
- Southern Region
  - Johor
  - Melaka
  - Negeri Sembilan

Although Johor has a coastline facing the South China Sea on the Pacific Ocean, it is not generally regarded as an East Coast state, since the main coastline of the state is located on the Straits of Johor of the Indian Ocean.

The East Coast of Peninsular Malaysia is socioculturally different in terms of overall racial composition and political affiliations compared to the West Coast – the states' demographics in the former are overwhelmingly Malay and its people lean towards social conservative and Islamist values, their electoral representation dominated by the Malaysian Islamic Party.

=== West Malaysia and East Malaysia (Borneo States) ===
The distinction between West and East Malaysia (Sabah and Sarawak) extends far beyond geography. Having existed as separate administrative regions before the formation of Malaysia, these states retain significantly more autonomy than the original States of Malaya under the Malaysia Agreement. This includes maintaining a distinct judicial court structure (with its own chief judge) and separate immigration regulations, privileges that were also afforded to Singapore prior to its separation.

These rights were codified as part of Sarawak's 18-point agreement and Sabah's 20-point agreement with the Federation of Malaya during the formation of the expanded federation. Consequently, freedom of movement is restricted for West Malaysian citizens travelling to East Malaysia, whereas East Malaysian citizens enjoy greater freedom of movement within West Malaysia. To this day, Sarawak and Sabah continue to exercise self-government in most areas except for external affairs.

== See also ==
- East Malaysia, the Bornean portion of Malaysia
- Geography of Malaysia
- Golden Chersonese
- Malaya (disambiguation)
- Malayan dollar
