= Malaysia Bill =

International treaty

Malaysia Bill of the Agreement relating to Malaysia
Malaysia Bill of Agreement relating to Malaysia between United Kingdom of Great Britain and Northern Ireland, Federation of Malaya, North Borneo, Sarawak and Singapore
- Malaysia Bill of the Agreement relating to Malaysia
- Drafted: 15 November 1961
- Signed: 9 July 1963
- Location: London, United Kingdom
- Sealed: 31 July 1963
- Effective: 16 September 1963
- Signatories: United Kingdom; Malaya; North Borneo; Sarawak; Singapore
- Parties: United Kingdom; Malaya; North Borneo; Sarawak; Singapore
- Depositary: British Government dated 21 September 1970; The Secretary-General of the United Nations acting in his capacity as depositary the following: (English), (French), and (Malay); Registered Nr. I-10760
- Languages: English and Malay

Full text
- Agreement relating to Malaysia between United Kingdom of Great Britain and Northern Ireland, Federation of Malaya, North Borneo, Sarawak and Singapore/Annex A at Wikisource

The Malaysia Bill is an annex of the Agreement relating to Malaysia between United Kingdom of Great Britain and Northern Ireland, Federation of Malaya, North Borneo, Sarawak and Singapore. It gave effect to the Agreement where that the British colonies of North Borneo, Sarawak and the State of Singapore should be federated with the existing States of the Federation of Malaya and the name of the federation should be Malaysia, and the Federal constitution wherewith to amend and adopt the Constitution of the Federation of Malaya so as to provide for the admission of those States. it adopted its present name, the name of the Constitution of the Federation of Malaya should be changed into Constitution of Malaysia.

== Documents ==
The following is the table of contents to the Malaysia Bill.

- Part I Preliminary
- Part II The States of the Federation
- Part III General Constitutional Arrangements
  - Title I General Provisions as to Federal and State Institutions
    - Chapter 1—Preliminary
    - Chapter 2—Heads of State
    - Chapter 3—Parliament, Legislative Assemblies and State Constitutions
    - Chapter 4—The Judiciary
  - Title II Citizenship
    - Chapter 1—Citizenship by operation of law
    - Chapter 2—Citizenship by registration or naturalisation, and transfer to or from Singapore
    - Chapter 3—Miscellaneous
  - Title III Legislative Powers and Administrative Arrangements
  - Title IV Financial Provisions
    - Chapter 1—Borneo States
    - Chapter 2—Singapore
    - Chapter 3—General
  - Title V Public Services
  - Title VI Protection of Special Interests
    - Chapter 1—General
    - Chapter 2—Borneo States
    - Chapter 3—Singapore
  - Title VII Supplementary
- Part IV Transitional and Temporary
    - Chapter 1—General
    - Chapter 2—State officers
    - Chapter 3—The courts and the judiciary
    - Chapter 4—Parliament and Legislative Assemblies

=== Schedules ===
First delimitation of constituencies

- First Schedule Insertion of new Articles in Constitution
- Second Schedule Section added to Eighth Schedule to Constitution
- Third Schedule—Citizenship (amendment of Second Schedule to Constitution)
- Fourth Schedule—Special Legislative Lists for Borneo States and Singapore
- Fifth Schedule—Additions for Borneo States to Tenth Schedule (Grants and assigned revenues) to Constitution
- Sixth Schedule—Minor and consequential amendments of Constitution

== Definitions ==
For the purpose of the federal and state institutions,

1. "Attorney-General" means the Attorney-General of the Federation
2. "Chief minister" and "Mentri Besar" both mean the president, by whatever style known, of the executive council in a state (and in particular "chief minister" includes the prime minister in Singapore)
3. "Executive Council" means the Cabinet or other body, however called, which in the government of a State corresponds, whether or not the members of it are Ministers, to the Cabinet of Ministers in the government of the Federation (and in particular includes the Supreme Council in Sarawak)
4. "Governor" means the Head of State, by whatever style known, in a State not having a Ruler (and in particular includes the Yang di-Pertua Negara in North Borneo and the Yang di-Pertuan Negara in Singapore)
5. "Legislative Assembly" means the representative assembly, however called, in the Legislature of a State (and in particular includes the Council Negri in Sarawak), but except in the Eighth Schedule includes also a Legislative Council, however called

== States of the federation ==
Part II enshrines name and number of the basic States of the federation

1. The name of the federation shall be known, in Malay and in English, by the name Malaysia.
2. The States of the Federation shall be—
  1. the States of Malaya, namely, Johor, Kedah, Kelantan, Malacca, Negeri Sembilan, Pahang, Penang, Perak, Perlis, Selangor and Terengganu; and
  2. the Borneo States, namely, North Borneo and Sarawak; and
  3. the State of Singapore.

== The Heads of State ==
The Chapter 2 of the General Constitutional Arrangements provides that the Governors of North Borneo, Sarawak and Singapore shall be members of the Conference of Rulers. Its main responsibility is the election of the Yang di-Pertuan Agong except for those purposes for which the Governors of Malacca and Penang are not members and became substituted the words "States not having a Ruler".

== See also ==
- Constitution of Malaysia
- Malaysia Agreement was signed on 9 July 1963 at London
- Malaysia Act 1963
