= Cobbold Commission =

Malaysian commission of enquiry

Report of the Commission of Enquiry, North Borneo and Sarawak, 1962
- Created: 17 January 1962
- Ratified: 21 June 1962
- Location: The National Archives, Kew, Richmond, Surrey TW9 4DU, United Kingdom
- Author(s): The Commission of Enquiry, North Borneo and Sarawak, 1961-1962
- Signatories: (United Kingdom) Lord Cobbold (Federation of Malaya) Wong Pow Nee (Federation of Malaya) Ghazali Shafie (United Kingdom) Anthony Abell (United Kingdom) David Watherston
- Purpose: The formation of Malaysia, 1961–1963

Full text
- Report of the Commission of Enquiry, North Borneo and Sarawak, 1962 at Wikisource

The Cobbold Commission was a Commission of Enquiry established to determine whether the people of North Borneo (now Sabah) and Sarawak supported the proposal to create the Federation of Malaysia consisting of Malaya, Brunei, Singapore, North Borneo, and Sarawak. It was also responsible for the subsequent drafting of the Constitution of Malaysia prior to the formation of Malaysia on 16 September 1963. The Commission was headed by former Bank of England governor Lord Cobbold.

== Members ==
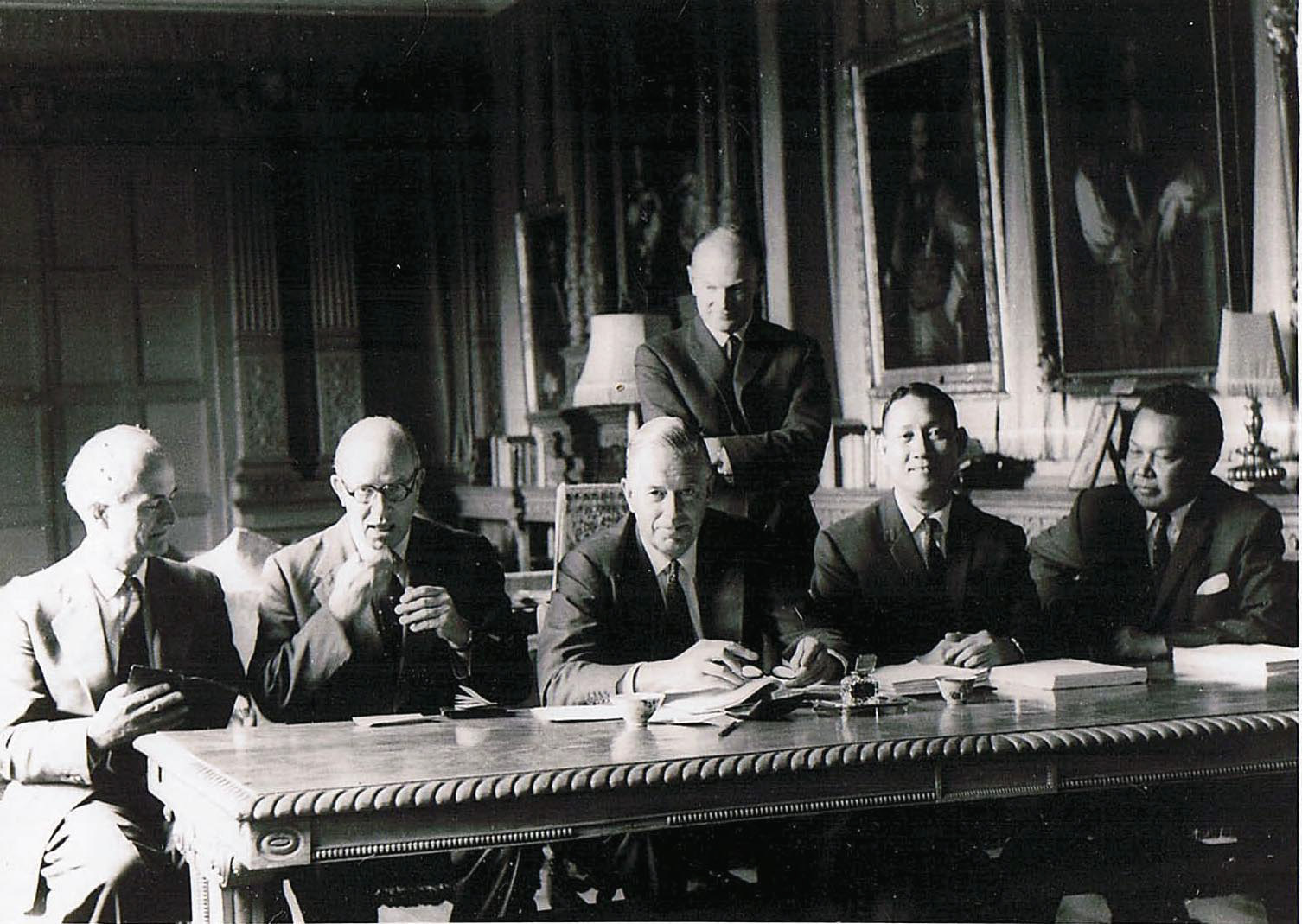
The members.

Members of the Commission were:

- Lord Cobbold, former Governor of the Bank of England, chairman of the Commission
- Wong Pow Nee, Chief Minister of Penang,
- Ghazali Shafie, Permanent Secretary to the Ministry of Foreign Affairs
- Anthony Abell, former Governor of Sarawak
- David Watherston, former Chief Secretary Of Malaya.

== Report ==
The Commission released its findings, report and recommendations on 1 August 1962. It concluded that the formation of Malaysia should be implemented. However, Lord Cobbold also stressed that all parties enter the federation as equal partners. Lord Cobbold had secretly, without disclosing in the report, written to British Prime Minister Harold Macmillan on 21 June 1962: "I have supported Malaysia in the report on the assumption that Singapore also joins in ... if Singapore were to drop out, a federation between Malaya and the Borneo territories without Singapore would have few attractions.

Cobbold Commission opined that compared to other options such as the continuation of British rule, early independence of the respective Borneo states or the creation of a federation of the Borneo states themselves, the Malaysia project offers the best option when the special positions are given to the Borneo states due to their different racial compositions, a great distance from the Malaya, and their political immaturity when compared to Malaya and Singapore. Abell and Watherston also opined that the formation of Malaysia would stifle the Communist takeover of Singapore, which in case of a Communist takeover, would likely have Domino effect on Sarawak and North Borneo.

Cobbold Commission also agreed that both Sarawak and North Borneo should keep their identity when entering the federation. This can be achieved by maintaining a high level of autonomy in local administration and allocating a certain quota of seats in the Malaysian parliament by taking into account the population and sizes of the Borneo states.

Lord Cobbold summarised the Commission's findings as follows:

About one-third of the population of each territory strongly favours early realisation of Malaysia without too much concern about terms and conditions. Another third, many of them favourable to the Malaysia project, ask, with varying degrees of emphasis, for conditions and safeguards varying in nature and extent: the warmth of support among this category would be markedly influenced by a firm expression of opinion by Governments that the detailed arrangements eventually agreed upon are in the best interests of the territories. The remaining third is divided between those who insist on independence before Malaysia is considered and those who would strongly prefer to see British rule continue for some years to come. If the conditions and reservations which they have put forward could be substantially met, the second category referred to above would generally support the proposals. Moreover once a firm decision was taken quite a number of the third category would be likely to abandon their opposition and decide to make the best of a doubtful job. There will remain a hard core, vocal and politically active, which will oppose Malaysia on any terms unless it is preceded by independence and self-government: this hard core might amount to near 20 per cent of the population of Sarawak and somewhat less in North Borneo.

— Chapter 3 item 144 in the Report of the Commission of Enquiry, North Borneo and Sarawak, 1962, page 55-56

Other recommendations of the Cobbold Commission Report include:

=== Head of federation ===
Cobbold Commission made no recommendation on whether the heads of state of Sabah and Sarawak are eligible to be elected as the heads of the Federation.

=== Name of the Federation ===
The name of the Federation is "Malaysia".

=== Religion ===
Cobbold Commission agreed that Islam should be the religion of the federation but would not jeopardise the freedom of other religions in the country, "which in effect would be secular".

=== Language ===
Cobbold Commission agreed on the unrestricted use of Malay, English and other indigenous languages in the respective Borneo state assemblies for 10 years after the formation of Malaysia, until the federal government, with the consultation of the respective Borneo state governments, that only the national language (Malay) can be used.

=== Immigration ===
Cobbold Commission recommended that entry of people outside of the country should rest with the federal government, while the Borneo states control the entry of people from other states in Malaysia. People employed by the state government should have unrestricted entry to Peninsular Malaysia, guaranteed by the federal government. Meanwhile, there should be unrestricted entry of people employed by the federal government into Borneo states, guaranteed by the state government. There should be unrestricted entry of people from Borneo states into Peninsular Malaysia. Visitor's permit of 3 months is allowed for those from Peninsular Malaysia to enter the Borneo states.

=== Right to secede ===
Cobbold Commission did not recommend a clause on secession in the federal constitution because it may cause political and racial divisions in the country.

== See also ==
- 18-point agreement (Sarawak)
- 20-point agreement (Sabah)
- Reid Commission
- Nine Cardinal Principles of the rule of the English Rajah
