= TMEM144 =

Transmembrane Protein 144

Identifiers
- Aliases: TMEM144, transmembrane protein 144
- External IDs: MGI: 1917902; GeneCards: TMEM144

Gene location (Human)
Chr.	Chromosome 4 (human)
Band	4q32.1	Start	158,201,604 bp
Band	4q32.1	End	158,255,416 bp

Gene location (Mouse)
Chr.	Chromosome 3 (mouse)
Band	3|3 E3	Start	79,812,564 bp
Band	3|3 E3	End	79,852,773 bp
RNA expression pattern
Bgee	Human / Mouse (ortholog); Top expressed in: corpus callosum; inferior ganglion of vagus nerve; C1 segment; pars reticulata; subthalamic nucleus; external globus pallidus; pons; internal globus pallidus; superior vestibular nucleus; pars compacta / Top expressed in: spermatid; seminiferous tubule; myocardium of ventricle; right ventricle; cardiac muscles; yolk sac; proximal tubule; right kidney; ileum; lumbar subsegment of spinal cord; More reference expression data
BioGPS	n/a
Gene ontology
Molecular function	carbohydrate transmembrane transporter activity
Cellular component	membrane; integral component of membrane
Biological process	carbohydrate transmembrane transport
Sources:Amigo / QuickGO
Orthologs
Databases	NCBI: entry; OMA: entry
Species	Human	Mouse
Entrez	55314	70652
Ensembl	ENSG00000164124	ENSMUSG00000027956
UniProt	Q7Z5S9	Q8VEH0
RefSeq (mRNA)	NM_018342	NM_027495
RefSeq (protein)	NP_060812	NP_081771; NP_001366471; NP_001366472; NP_001366473
Location (UCSC)	Chr 4: 158.2 – 158.26 Mb	Chr 3: 79.81 – 79.85 Mb
PubMed search
- Wikidata
View/Edit Human	View/Edit Mouse

Conceptual translation of Transmembrane Protein 144 mRNA transcript sequence with peptide sequence. DNA annotations mark an upstream in-frame stop codon, start codon, exon borders, stop codon, polyadenylation signals, and polyadenylation sites. Protein annotations mark the ten transmembrane domain regions, internal repeats, and the region of the protein excluded from the second isoform. Amino acids conserved in distant orthologs are bolded.

Transmembrane Protein 144 (TMEM144) is a protein in humans encoded by the TMEM144 gene.

== Gene ==
Transmembrane Protein 144 is located on the plus strand of chromosome 4 (4q32.1), spanning a total of 40,857 base pairs. The TMEM144 gene transcribes a mRNA sequence 3,210 nucleotides in length and composed of 13 exons.

== Protein ==
There exist two isoforms of human Transmembrane Protein 144. Isoform one consist of 345 amino acids with a total mass of 37.6 kDa. This isoform has a theoretical isoelectric point of 6.63. The second isoform is 169 amino acids long with a mass of 18.3 kDa.

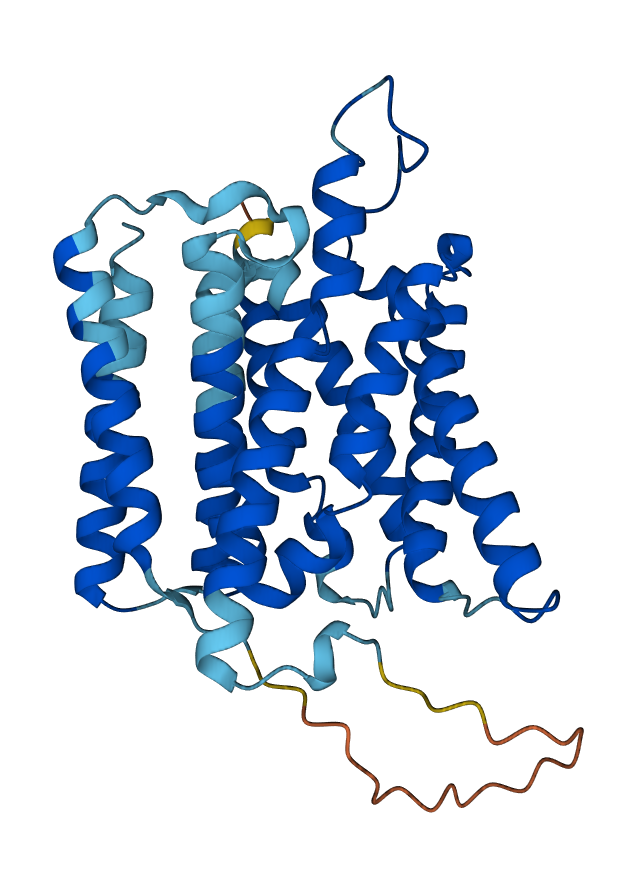
Predicted tertiary structure of human transmembrane protein 144. Regions of dark blue are very high confidence, light blue regions are confident, yellow regions are low confidence, and orange regions are very low confidence.

=== Expression ===
TMEM144 is over-expressed in adult brain tissue with low regional specificity. TMEM144 appears enriched in oligodendrocytes and immune cells, such as dendritic cells and monocytes.

=== Cellular localization ===
Precise cell localization has multiple predicted locations. Localization tools state TMEM144 is likely found in the plasma membrane, endoplasmic reticulum, Lysosome/Vacuole, or Golgi apparatus. However, an immunofluorescent staining of various human cell lines display localization to the mitochondria.

=== Post translational modifications ===
There exists five predicted post translational modifications for TMEM144, including four sites of phosphorylation and a sumoylation site.

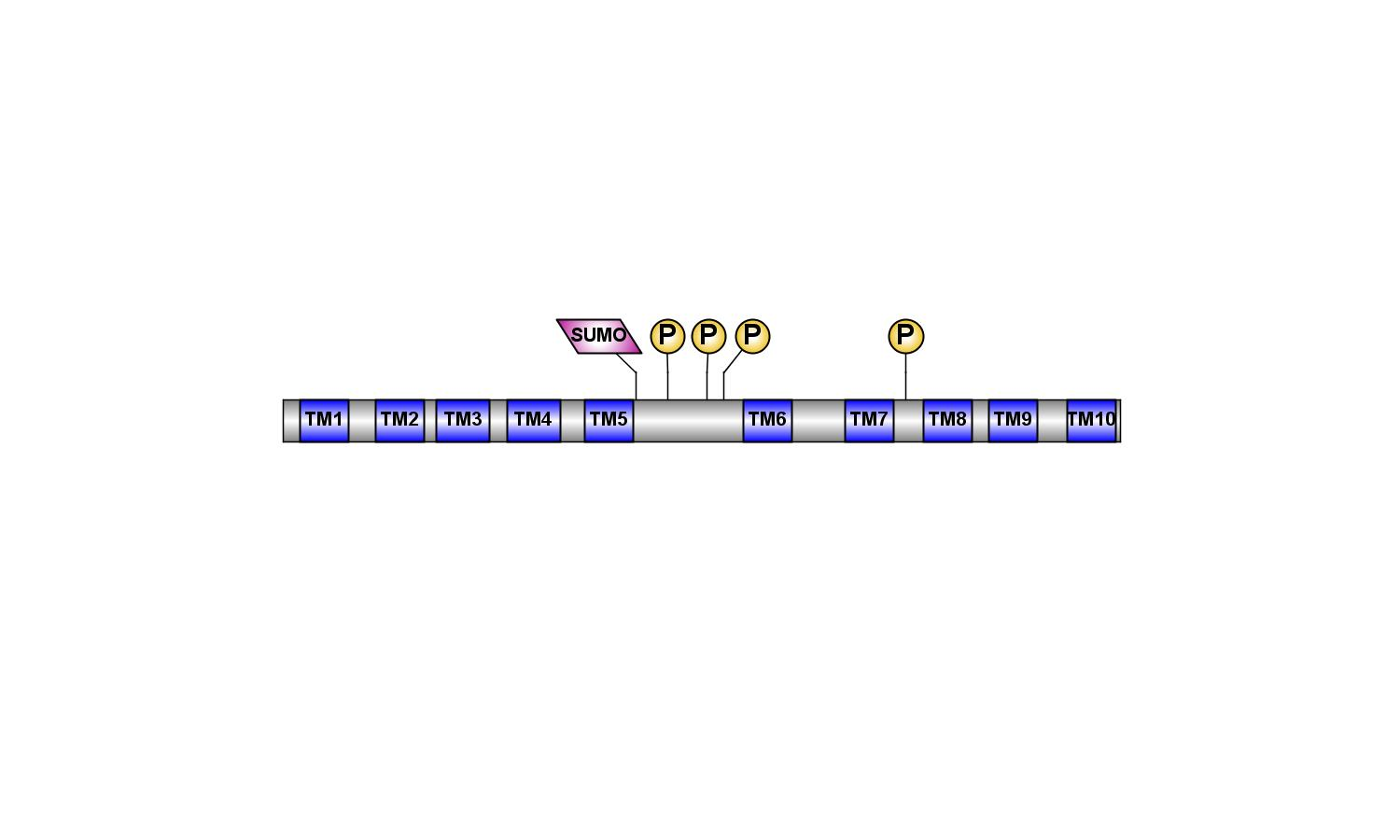
Transmembrane Protein 144 schematic with transmembrane domains and predicted post translational modifications. P indicates predicted sites of phosphorylation. SUMO indicates a predicted sumoylation site.

=== Interacting proteins ===
Several proteins have been observed to be physically associated with TMEM144, including Transmembrane Protein 237, Homocysteine-Responsive Endoplasmic Reticulum-Resident Ubiquitin-Like Domain Member 2 Protein, Translocase of Inner Mitochondrial Membrane Domain-Containing Protein 1, Free Fatty Acid Receptor 2, Aquaporin 6, Serine Rich Single-Pass Membrane Protein 1, and Adrenoceptor Beta 2.

== Homology ==
Transmembrane Protein 144 arose approximately 694 million years ago in desert locust. It can be found in both vertebrates and invertebrates. It takes TMEM144 approximately 6.8 million years to make a 1% change to its amino acid sequence, indicating a moderately low rate of evolution.

Multiple sequence alignment of human Transmembrane Protein 144 with vertebrate orthologs. Some amino acids in the ortholog sequences were cut out at the N-terminus. Amino acids are highlighted by shared properties and structure. Consensus sequences denote highly conserved amino acids with a capital letter, moderately conserved amino acids with a lowercase letter, and low conservation with a dot. A plus or minus symbol in the consensus sequence indicates conserved basic (+) or acidic (-) properties. Transmembrane regions are boxed in orange and exon boundaries are marked in pink.

Multiple sequence alignment of human Transmembrane Protein 144 to invertebrate orthologs. Consensus sequences denote highly conserved amino acids with a capital letter, moderately conserved amino acids with a lowercase letter, and low conservation with a dot. A plus or minus symbol in the consensus sequence indicates conserved basic (+) or acidic (-) properties. Transmembrane regions are boxed in orange and exon boundaries are marked in pink.

=== Ortholog table ===
Genus and species	Common name	Taxonomic Class	Median Date of Divergence (MYA)	Accession #	Sequence length (aa)	Sequence identity (%)	Sequence similarity (%)
Homo Sapiens	Human	Mammalia	0	NP_060812.2	345	100.0	100.0
Carlito syrichta	Philippine tarsier	Mammalia	69	XP_012639059.1	345	94.2	97.4
Mus musculus	House mouse	Mammalia	87	NP_001366471.1	348	85.9	92.2
Trichosurus vulpecula	Brushtail possum	Mammalia	160	XP_036620586.1	349	77.7	90.3
Chelydra serpentina	Snapping turtle	Reptilia	319	KAG6931534.1	358	67.0	84.1
Gallus gallus	Red junglefowl	Aves	319	XP_420383.2	357	66.9	82.6
Zootoca vivipara	Viviparous lizard	Reptilia	319	XP_034969125.1	360	65.9	82.3
Rana temporaria	Common frog	Amphibia	353	XP_040188243.1	358	64.2	81.0
Protopterus annectens	West African lungfish	Dipnoi	408	XP_043918387.1	407	56.4	69.6
Latimeria chalumnae	African coelacanth	Coelacanthi	414	XP_014346971.1	407	56.0	71.6
Danio rerio	Zebrafish	Actinopterygii	431	NP_001005983.1	380	50.0	64.8
Amblyraja radiata	Thorny skate	Chondrichthyes	464	XP_032874310.1	486	45.7	58.4
Branchiostoma lanceolatum	European lancelet	Leptocardii	556	CAH1267272.1	402	44.1	58.8
Petromyzon marinus	Sea lamprey	Hyperoartia	599	XP_032811478.1	396	50.1	64.9
Ciona intestinalis	Vase tunicate	Ascidiacea	603	XP_026696612.1	395	46.6	59.2
Strongylocentrotus purpuratus	Purple sea urchin	Echinoidea	619	XP_030836295.1	363	46.8	64.7
Echinococcus multilocularis	Cyclophyllid tapeworm	Cestoda	694	CDS37915.1	351	41.0	59.8
Caenorhabditis elegans	Roundworm	Chromadorea	694	NP_498062.2	345	38.7	56.0
Mytilus edulis	Blue mussel	Bivalvia	694	CAG2251154.1	385	36.0	52.0
Schistocerca gregaria	Desert locust	Insecta	694	XP_049849104.1	278	25.6	44.1

== Clinical significance ==
Transmembrane Protein 144 is predicted to be a direct or indirect negative regulator of kisspeptin. High expression of TMEM144 is prognostically favorable for patient with endometrial cancer. Whereas in patients with pancreatic cancer, high expression of TMEM144 is associated with poor prognostic outcomes.
