= David Watherston =

British colonial administrator (1907-1977)

Yang Berbahagia Tan Sri Sir David Watherston PMN(K) KBE CMG
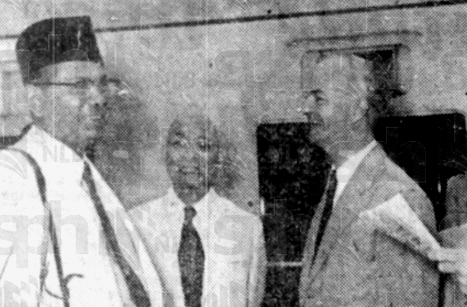
- David Watherston with Tunku Abdul Rahman

Chief Secretary, Federation of Malaya
- In office 1952–1957
- Preceded by: Sir Vincent Del Tufo
- Succeeded by: Abdul Aziz Majid (Chief Secretary to the Government of Malaysia)

Personal details
- Born: 26 February 1907
- Died: 16 January 1977 (aged 69)
- Children: 2 sons and 2 daughters
- Education: Christ Church, Oxford
- Occupation: Colonial administrator and civil servant

Sir David Watherston (26 February 1907 – 16 January 1977) was a British colonial administrator who served as Chief Secretary, Federation of Malaya from 1952 to 1957, and played a major role in the creation of Malaysia.

== Early life and education ==
Watherston was born on 26 February 1907, the son of Charles Watherston. He was educated at Westminster School and Christ Church, Oxford.

== Career ==
Watherston joined the Malayan civil service as a cadet in 1930, and then served in various posts. From 1940 to 1944, he was seconded to the Colonial Office, and then worked in the British Military Administration, Malaya. From 1946 to 1948, he served as Secretary of the Constitutional Working Committee which created the new Federation of Malaya to replace the Malayan Union. In 1948, he was Secretary for Defence and Internal Security of the Federation of Malaya when the Federation was faced with the Malayan Emergency, and was at the centre of the armed conflict against the Malayan Communist Party. In 1952, he was promoted to Chief Secretary, Federation of Malaya and administered the government on several occasions. He served in office until 1957 when Malaya was handed over to the independent elected government under its first prime minister, Tunku Abdul Rahman.

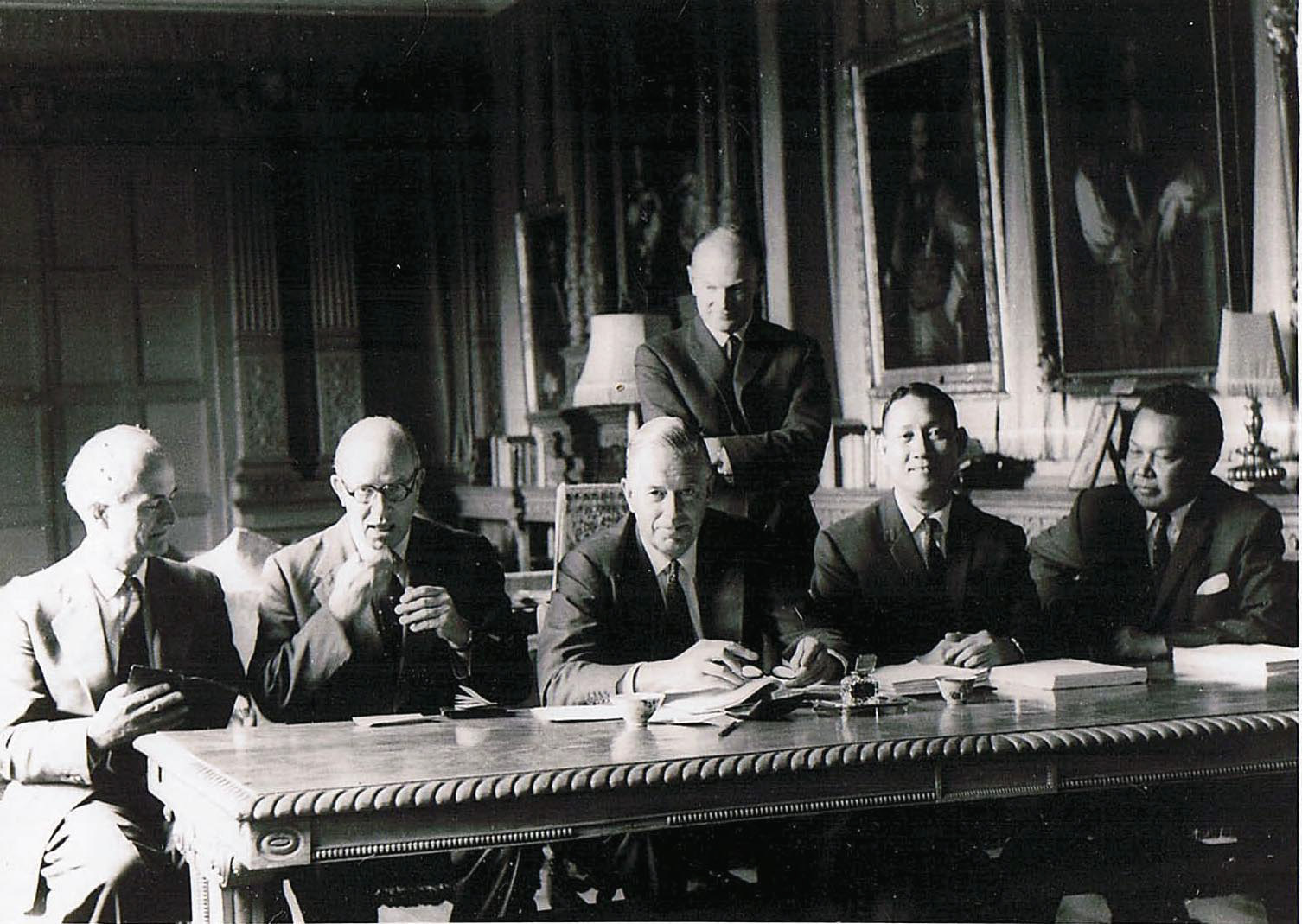
The signing of the Cobbold Report of the Commission of Enquiry, North Borneo and Sarawak, at Knebworth House, London on 21 June 1962. The Commission consists of five members, and is chaired by Lord Cobbold, a former governor of the Bank of England. Its other members are Wong Pow Nee and Ghazali Shafie, representing the government of Malaya, Anthony Abell, and David Watherston (in extreme left), the representative of the British government. H. Harris (standing) acted as the Secretary.

Watherston served as Special Counsellor of the Malayan High Commission in London from 1957 to 1959. He was responsible for the recruitment of staff in Britain for service in the Federation of Malaya, and his duties also included those formerly performed by the Trade Commissioner for Malaya in the United Kingdom. In 1962, he returned briefly to the Far East as a member of the Cobbold Commission which created the foundations for an enlarged Federation of Malaysia to include the Borneo States of Sarawak and Sabah.

After retiring from colonial service, Watherston served on the board at Tube Investments as Director of Personnel and Group Adviser Personnel, remaining in the post from 1959 to 1974 at a time of rapid change in training and recruitment practices. He served as vice-chairman of the Council of the Foundation for Management Education, and was also a member of the governing body of the London Business School. From 1969 to 1973, he was Chairman of the Electricity Supply Industry's training board.

== Personal life and death ==
Watherston married Maude Noble in 1933 and they had 2 sons and 2 daughters.

Watherston died in Britain on 16 January 1977.

== Honours ==
Watherston was appointed Companion of the Order of St Michael and St George (CMG) in the 1953 Coronation Honours. He was appointed Knight Commander of the Order of the British Empire (KBE) in the 1956 New Year Honours. In 1958, he was made Hon Panglima Mangku Negara by Malaysia.

- United Kingdom :
  - Companion of the Order of St Michael and St George (CMG) (1953)
  - Knight Commander of the Order of the British Empire (KBE) – Sir (1956)
- Malaya :
  - Honorary Commander of the Order of the Defender of the Realm (PMN (K)) – Tan Sri (1958)
