= Malaysia Agreement =

Treaty combining Malaya, North Borneo, Sarawak, and Singapore into Malaysia

Agreement relating to Malaysia between United Kingdom of Great Britain and Northern Ireland, Federation of Malaya, North Borneo, Sarawak and Singapore
- Agreement relating to Malaysia
- Drafted: 15 November 1961; 64 years ago
- Signed: 9 July 1963; 63 years ago
- Location: London, United Kingdom
- Sealed: 31 July 1963; 63 years ago
- Effective: 16 September 1963; 63 years ago
- Signatories: Malaya; North Borneo (Sabah); Sarawak; Singapore; United Kingdom
- Parties: Malaya; North Borneo (Sabah); Sarawak; Singapore; United Kingdom
- Depositary: Government of the United Kingdom; Secretary-General of the United Nations, acting in his capacity as depositary
- Languages: English, French and Malay

Full text
- Agreement relating to Malaysia between United Kingdom of Great Britain and Northern Ireland, Federation of Malaya, North Borneo, Sarawak and Singapore at Wikisource

The Malaysia Agreement (MA63), (Note: Malay: Perjanjian Malaysia; Chinese: 马来西亚协定; Tamil: மலேசிய ஒப்பந்தம்) formally known as the Agreement relating to Malaysia between United Kingdom of Great Britain and Northern Ireland, Federation of Malaya, North Borneo, Sarawak and Singapore, (Note: Malay: Perjanjian yang berhubungan dengan Malaysia antara United Kingdom Great Britain dan Ireland Utara, Persekutuan Tanah Melayu, Borneo Utara, Sarawak dan Singapura; Chinese: 大不列颠及北爱尔兰联合王国与马来亚联合邦、北婆罗洲、砂拉越和新加坡之间关于马来西亚的协定; Tamil: ஐக்கிய இராச்சியம், வடக்கு அயர்லாந்து, மலாயா கூட்டமைப்பு, வடக்கு போர்னியோ, சரவாக், சிங்கப்பூர் நிலப் பகுதிகளுக்கு இடையே மலேசியா தொடர்பான ஒப்பந்தம்) is a founding document which provided for the union of North Borneo (Sabah), Sarawak and Singapore with the existing states of the Federation of Malaya. This new political entity was to be known simply as Malaysia. (Note: See: The UK Statute Law Database: the Acts of the Parliament of the United Kingdom Malaysia Act 1963) (Note: See: The UK Statute Law Database: the Acts of the Parliament of the United Kingdom Federation of Malaya Independence Act 1957 (c. 60))

Signed in London, United Kingdom, the agreement came into effect on 16 September 1963, which is now commemorated as Malaysia Day. Less than two years later, Singapore separated from Malaysia following political and economic disagreements, becoming a sovereign state on 9 August 1965.

== Background ==
Prior to World War II, British Malaya consisted of three groups of polities: the protectorate of the Federated Malay States, five protected Unfederated Malay States and the crown colony of the Straits Settlements. Throughout the 20th century, decolonisation became the societal goal of the peoples under colonial regimes aspiring to achieve self-determination. The Special Committee on Decolonisation (also known as the U.N. Special Committee of the 24 on Decolonisation, reflected in the United Nations General Assembly's proclamation on 14 December 1960 of the Declaration on the Granting of Independence to Colonial Countries and Peoples hereinafter, the Committee of 24, or simply, the Decolonisation Committee) was established in 1961 by the General Assembly of the United Nations with the purpose of monitoring implementation of the Declaration on the Granting of Independence to Colonial Countries and Peoples and to make recommendations on its application. (Note: See: the United Nations Special Committee on Decolonisation – Official Website)

The committee is also a successor to the former Committee on Information from Non-Self-Governing Territories. Hoping to speed the progress of decolonisation, the General Assembly had adopted in 1960 the Resolution 1514, also known as the "Declaration on the Granting of Independence to Colonial Countries and Peoples" or simply "Declaration on Decolonisation". It stated that all people have a right to self-determination and proclaimed that colonialism should be brought to a speedy and unconditional end.

Under the Malaysia Agreement signed between the United Kingdom and Malaya, Britain would enact an act to relinquish sovereign control over Singapore, Sarawak and North Borneo (now Sabah). This was accomplished through the enactment of the Malaysia Act 1963, clause 1(1) of which states that on Malaysia Day, "Her Majesty's sovereignty and jurisdiction in respect of the new states shall be relinquished so as to vest in the manner agreed".

=== Malayan Union ===
In 1946, the Malayan Union was established in British Malaya which comprised the Federated Malay States of Perak, Selangor, Negeri Sembilan, Pahang; the Unfederated Malay States of Kedah, Perlis, Kelantan, Terengganu, Johor; and the Straits Settlements of Penang and Malacca. Meanwhile, Britain had direct rule over Singapore as a crown colony. It came through a series of agreements between the United Kingdom and the Malayan Union. (Note: See: Cabinet Memorandum by the Secretary of State for the Colonies. 21 February 1956 Federation of Malaya Agreement) The Malayan Union was superseded by the Federation of Malaya on 1 February 1948, and achieved independence within the Commonwealth of Nations on 31 August 1957 as part of the Malayan Declaration of Independence.

=== Decolonisation, self-determination and referendum ===
The issue of self-determination with respect to the peoples of North Borneo, Sarawak, and Singapore formed the bedrock of yet another challenge to the formation of the Federation of Malaysia. Under the Joint Statement issued by the British and Malayan Federal Governments on 23 November 1961, clause 4 provided:

Before coming to any final decision it is necessary to ascertain the views of the peoples of North Borneo and Sarawak. It has accordingly been decided to set up a Commission to carry out this task and to make recommendations.

In the spirit of ensuring that decolonisation was carried in accordance with the wishes of the peoples of northern Borneo, the British Government, working with the Malayan Government, appointed a Commission of Enquiry for North Borneo and Sarawak in January 1962 to determine if the people supported the proposal to create a Federation of Malaysia. The five-man team, which comprised two Malayans and three British representatives, was headed by Lord Cobbold. (Note: Cobbold was Governor of the Bank of England from 1949 to 1961. The other members were Wong Pow Nee, Chief Minister of Penang, Mohammed Ghazali Shafie, Permanent Secretary to the Ministry of Foreign Affairs, Anthony Abell, former Governor or Sarawak, and David Watherston, former Chief Secretary of Malaya.) The Commission released its findings, report and recommendations on 1 August 1962 where it is concluded that the formation of Malaysia should be implemented. However, Lord Cobbold also stressed that all parties enter the federation as equal partners. Lord Cobbold had secretly, without disclosing in the report, written to British Prime Minister Harold Macmillan on 21 June 1962:

I have supported Malaysia in the report on the assumption that Singapore also joins in ... if Singapore were to drop out, a federation between Malaya and the Borneo territories without Singapore would have few attractions.

— Lord Cobbold, British representative on the Malaysia Agreement

== Reception in Singapore, Brunei, and Kelantan ==
=== Disagreements in Singapore ===
In Singapore, the People's Action Party (PAP) initially sought merger with Malaysia on the basis of the strong mandate it obtained during the general elections of 1959 when it won 43 of the 51 seats. However, this mandate became questionable when dissension within the Party led to a split. In July 1961, following a debate on a vote of confidence in the government, 13 PAP Assemblymen were expelled from the PAP for abstaining. They went on to form a new political party, the Barisan Sosialis (BS), the PAP's majority in the Legislative Assembly was whittled down as they now only commanded 30 of the 51 seats. More defections occurred until the PAP had a majority of just one seat in the Assembly.

Given this situation, it would have been impossible to rely on the mandate achieved in 1959 to move forth with merger. A referendum was eventually held in 1962 for a new mandate. This new mandate was seen as necessary, especially since BS argued that the terms of merger offered were detrimental to Singaporeans – such as having reduced seats in the federal parliament compared to its population, only being able to vote in Singapore elections, and the obligation that Singapore contribute 40% of its revenue to the federal government. To allay these concerns, a number of Singapore–specific provisions were included in the Agreement. Singapore ultimately separated from Malaysia on 9 August 1965.

=== Brunei's refusal ===
Although Brunei sent a delegation to the signing of the Malaysia Agreement, they did not sign, as the Sultan of Brunei wished to be recognised as the senior ruler in the entire federation, disagreements over the sharing of oil revenues and what had happened during the Brunei revolt. It would continue to be a British protectorate until it became a sovereign state within the Commonwealth of Nations on 1 January 1984.

=== Kelantan's claims ===
On 11 September 1963, just four days before the new Federation of Malaysia was to come into existence, the Government of the State of Kelantan sought a declaration claiming that the Malaysia Agreement and Malaysia Act were null and void, or alternatively, that even if they were valid, they did not bind the State of Kelantan. The Kelantan Government argued that both the Malaysia Agreement and the Malaysia Act were not binding on Kelantan on the following grounds that the Malaysia Act in effect abolished Malaya and this was contrary to the 1957 Malaya Agreement that the proposed changes required the consent of each of the constituent states of the Federation of Malaya – including Kelantan – and this had not been obtained. This suit was dismissed by Sir James Thomson, then Chief Justice, who ruled that the constitution had not been violated during the discussion and creation of the Malaysia Act.

== Current issues ==
Over the decades after the agreement, many academics and politicians have argued that the promises made to Sarawak and North Borneo (Sabah) have been eroded over time by the federal government. After the historic initial defeat of the Alliance/Barisan Nasional (BN) government in the 2018 Malaysian general election, the Pakatan Harapan (PH) government promised to look into Sarawak and Sabah's grievances in relation to the Malaysia Agreement which had been neglected.

After a proposed 2019 amendment to the Constitution of Malaysia to restore the status of Sabah and Sarawak according to the original content of Malaysia Agreement failed to pass a two-thirds majority, the federal government compromised to review the agreement to remedy breaches of the treaty with a "Special Cabinet Committee To Review the Malaysia Agreement". The seven agreed issues were:

- Export duty claims on logging exports and forest products.
- Gas distribution and regulatory powers on electricity and gas.
- Implementation of Federal and State Public Works.
- Manpower.
- The power of the state on health issues.
- Administration of Sipadan and Ligitan islands for Sabah.
- Agricultural and forestry issues.

The first meeting about these issues was held on 17 December 2018. Despite the willingness of the federal government to review the agreement, reports surfaced that negotiations between Sabah and the federal government had not been smooth, with the latter dictating some matters of the review, causing the perception that the review was a one-sided affair with the government appearing reluctant to relinquish control of affairs.

In another 2021 amendment to the Constitution of Malaysia, Article 160 (2) of the federal constitution was amended with the new definition of the term "federation" where the Malaysian federation is formed in accordance to the 1963 Malaysian agreement in addition to 1957 Malaya agreement. In February 2022, the name of the head of government of Sarawak was changed from "Chief Minister" to "Premier". In 2024, it was proposed that Sabah does the same.

In March 2022, 11 people from Sarawak filed a writ application to the High Court of Sarawak to declare the Malaysia Agreement as null and void on the argument that the people of Sarawak did not unconditionally exercise self-determination nor referendum was held before the formation of Malaysia. In April 2022, the Government of Sarawak tried to strike out the suit on reasons that the High Court had no jurisdiction to enforce or nullify an international treaty like the Malaysia Agreement. In May 2023, the high court in Kuching dismissed the suit because the Federal Constitution of Malaysia is the supreme law of the country and for Sarawak to leave the federation, the Federal Constitution needs to be amended.

On 19 January 2026, the King of Malaysia, Sultan Ibrahim Iskandar called on every member of the Malaysian parliament (MPs) to return to the original spirit of the Malaysia Agreement that forms the basis of the Federation of Malaysia and cautioned against actions that could create tension between East and West Malaysia since every debate and vote in the Dewan Rakyat would shape the nation's future, urging them to perform their duties wisely and responsibly for all citizens. In his speech:

The Malaysia Agreement laid the foundation for Malaysia's formation by uniting Malaya, Sabah and Sarawak into a single federation. We should return to the original intent of our country’s formation, which is unity, mutual respect, and close co-operation between the states and the federal government. Differences between the regions should be resolved in a mature manner, without hatred or suspicion, and that the rights of the Bornean states must be respected, while prioritising the country's shared interests.

— Sultan Ibrahim Iskandar, the 17th King of Malaysia

=== 2025 Sabah High Court ruling ===
Through a ruling on 17 October 2025, the High Court of Kota Kinabalu ruled that the Malaysian federal government has acted unlawfully by failing to fulfil Sabah's right to 40% of federal revenue derived from the region for nearly 50 years. The court, through its ruling, ruled the federal government's issuance of a special grant to the Sabah government from 2022 to 2025 and its method of deriving the sum to be granted to be unlawful, and the federal government has been ordered to review and determine the quantum of the grant with the Sabah state government and reach an agreement within 180 days, or 15 April 2026, after finding that there had not been a review since 1974. The federal government, through Prime Minister Anwar Ibrahim, then made a contrasting response that they will not appeal the court ruling decision, before changing his remarks the following days that they will "only file an appeal against the Kota Kinabalu High Court's grounds of judgement regarding the 40% special grant for Sabah, and not against the decision on the state's entitlement". In another remarks, he further claimed that the court ruling on the federal entitlement invites misleading interpretations that the federal government only takes revenue from Sabah without contributing to its development. Malaysia's former Minister in the Prime Minister's Department for Legal Affairs and Judicial Reform Zaid Ibrahim further chided the ruling through his own podcast in YouTube and said that if the federal government should pay as per the ruling, they will immediately become bankrupt; thus, he rather called for the removal of "burden" of Malaya with cancellation of the Malaysia Agreement and went as far as implying that both Sabah and Sarawak could pursue independence if they were unhappy.

His remarks were subsequently criticised and attracted outrage from both Sabah and Sarawak state governments, opposition, various legal teams and NGOs, where he was warned that national issues are not material for jokes and it could become reality soon and lead to the termination of the Malaysia Agreement and subsequent dismantlement of the Federation of Malaysia. A year before, Zaid also expressed his worriness with the way Sarawak state oil company (Petros) deal with federal government oil company (Petronas) for the latter "alleged disrespect of state laws, as well as claims that Sarawak may sever ties with the federal government over the oil issues". The Change Advocate Movement Sabah (CAMOS) Youth Wing also saw the comments made by Zaid, who is a former law person, "revealed the real attitude of the Malayan colonialist mentality when the latter always had his own perception that Malaya was robbed by the British government when they signed the Malaysia Agreement with Sabah and Sarawak" despite the ruling actually being the return of Sabah's rights that has been ignored by the federal government for 50 years. Zaid then made another controversial statement that what he saw as Sabah's and Sarawak's pursuit for their constitutional safeguards, which has been ignored for decades, "was a game of outwitting Malaya by forming a Borneo Bloc and began to challenge federal laws", where he was further criticised harshly. Nevertheless, contrasting his current opinion that he perceived the East Malaysian region wanted to overtake West Malaysian political influence, Zaid once personally asked Sarawak to lead the country a year before in 2024, following Sarawak's rapid economic success compared to what he saw as the present decline of the federation of Malaysia, especially in the past 50 years, partly as a result of West Malaysian politicians persistent playing on "race, religion and royalty (3R)" issues.

Within the heightened issues between the Sabah government and the Malaysian federal government over Sabah rights, a West Malaysian Multimedia University law lecturer analyst, Hafiz Hassan, further tried to downgrade the relevant status of Sabah and Sarawak with the opinion that "both were merely states within the federation, not separate 'partners' that jointly formed the country of Malaysia", adding that their status is just like the states that already existed within the Federation of Malaya. His comments were subsequently rebuked by the president of Borneo's Plight in Malaysia Foundation (BoPiMaFo), Daniel John Jambun, who reminded him that such a statement reflects a narrow and incomplete reading of Malaysia's constitutional history since only Sabah and Sarawak entered Malaysia through an international treaty which is known as the Malaysia Agreement, whilst the other eleven Malayan Federation states did not since they were already constituent states within the independent Federation of Malaya formed in 1957. He added the federation itself; Malaysia came into existence because these Borneo territories agreed to form a new federation based on specific safeguards and solemn assurances. If commitments are continued to be gradually ignored, diluted, or reinterpreted out of existence, then the question that West Malaysians should ask is not whether both territories are equal to other states but whether the constitutional promises made to the Borneo states in 1963 are still being honoured in good faith by them or otherwise betrayed, since history records clearly that the Malaysian federation was created through a valid agreement, not merely a territorial conquest or absorption.

On 5 March 2026, a leaked document received by the Tuaran Member of Parliament (MP) of Sabah Wilfred Madius Tangau giving details that the federal government of Malaysia under Anwar Ibrahim "has secretly appealed for the postponement of the court ruling in February 2026" despite the prime minister's persistent announcement to the general East Malaysian public that there will be no appeal on the case, revealing the contrasting statement made by a prime minister and doubtful sincerity with false promises. Following the findings, Sabahan MPs and senators have announced they have prepared to back legal action against the federal government if negotiations over the Sabah's 40% constitutional revenue entitlement fail to yield results by 15 April 2026. Chief Political Secretary to the Sabah Chief Minister Azrul Ibrahim further reiterated the calls for the federal government to begin partial payments related to Sabah's 40% revenue entitlement while formal negotiations are underway without delaying the issues further, which is also similarly echoed earlier by the leader of Sabah's opposition and former Chief Minister Shafie Apdal.

Sabah's Deputy Chief Minister III, Ewon Benedick, has stated a firm stand will be taken against the federal government appeal, where he further urged any politicians in West Malaysia to respect Sabah's and Sarawak's rights since Malaysia would not exist in the first place if not for the two agreeing to form a joint federation, where both Bornean states have been subsidising development in West Malaysia through both oil and gas revenues. A similar stance was expressed by Beluran MP Ronald Kiandee, where he said, regardless of the reasons given by the federal government to justify the appeal, the move appeared to delay the High Court order and downplay Sabah's rights within the federation. The Sabah Attorney General's Chambers, in a response to the federal government's appeal for a stay on the review, have stated they will oppose any federal government bid to pause a court-ordered review of Sabah's 40% special grant entitlement, adding that the chambers will always take the necessary legal steps to safeguard the rights and interests of Sabah, while supporting a process that is consistent with the rule of law, constitutional principles and cooperative engagement between the federal and state governments. Chairman of the Bingkor Community Welfare Association of Sabah, Yazid Mohd Hasnan Tawik @ Charles, further said that the court decision was not merely an administrative ruling but a judicial decision that must be upheld, respected and implemented by the federal government without any delaying tactics since any attempts will only attract the general public perception that Sabah's constitutional rights continue to be sidelined by the federal government.

The Minister in the Prime Minister's Department (Sabah and Sarawak affairs), Mustapha Sakmud, then made a clarification that the stay bid will not affect the ruling; rather, it was on some aspects of the court order. On 15 March 2026, Prime Minister Anwar Ibrahim, during another visit to Sabah at a state-level breaking-of-fast of Ramadan event, reaffirms the final commitment of the federal government to Sabah's 40% revenue claim, where he explained "the entitlement to Sabah as a final and non-negotiable policy decision of their rights". Although these statements were applauded, they are also viewed with high scepticism and caution from the general East Malaysian public and political leaders due to persistent broken promises and contrasting statements to what has been promised during general announcements. On 30 May, during Prime Minister Anwar's other visit to Sabah to officiate the Kaamatan state harvest festival celebration, he announced that the interim allocation to Sabah will be increased to RM1.5 billion from RM600 million by 2027 while discussions between the federal and state governments on the finalisation of Sabah's constitutional claim to a 40% revenue entitlement continue. He stressed that the federal government is committed to honouring the entitlement, adding there is no dispute over the policy, and he also does not want to be known as a leader that breaks his promise to the people.

=== Balance parliamentary seats between West Malaysia and East Malaysia ===
On early 26 September 2025, the federal government of Malaysia, through Prime Minister Anwar Ibrahim during a campaign speech in Tawau District, Sabah prior to the 2025 Sabah state election, has announced the government's willingness to increase the Federal Electoral Divisions seats of East Malaysia's representation to be on par (one-third representation) with West Malaysia as part of their ongoing negotiations with the governments of Sabah and Sarawak on the Malaysia Agreement issues. A former West Malaysian Dewan Rakyat speaker, Azhar Harun, then tried to dispute Bornean state rights on the matter by claiming he had reviewed the Malaysia Agreement, the Federal Constitution, the Malaysia Act 1963, and the report by the Intergovernmental Committee (IGC) documents and said nothing that specified that Sabah, Sarawak and Singapore were to occupy 35% of the seats in the Dewan Rakyat, to which his statement was responded to by Sarawak's Gabungan Parti Sarawak (GPS) senior leader Abdul Karim Rahman Hamzah, who said "that Azhar had not gone into deeper research on the historical agreements and conventions leading to the country's formation, adding that the one-third of parliamentary seats for Sabah, Sarawak and Singapore during Malaysia's formation was a safeguard against dominance by the Federation of Malaya, on which not all safeguards were spelt out in the Constitution but can be found in the minutes of meetings and conventions throughout the negotiations that led to the formation of the country". Further on, 16 November 2025, Prime Minister Anwar repeated the federal government stance, although his statement later changed to "there is still no real commitment" on the matters. According to Malaysia's minister in the Prime Minister's Department, Azalina Othman Said, the Election Commission (EC) can only begin the review of the delimitation after amendments are made to Article 46 of the Federal Constitution, where the constitutional amendment process is a mandatory prerequisite before the EC can conduct a new demarcation study, in line with the provisions of Article 113(3A) of the Federal Constitution. Azalina's statement was subsequently responded to by the Sabah People's Ideas Party (Gagasan Rakyat) Vice President Masiung Banah, who said her recent parliamentary remarks on parliamentary seat expansions of Sabah and Sarawak contradicted the Prime Minister's own commitment on the matter to the Borneo states, in which her answer directly conflicts a recent commitment made by the prime minister, who had agreed in principle to adding seats since the present seats are always being seen as lopsided in favour of West Malaysian sides in deciding any bills for the country. Masiung earlier said the demand to increase the number of parliamentary seats should not be linked to legislation as a reason to reject the proposal but rather needs to be reviewed in the Malaysia Agreement since the principle was not just a political demand since it was indeed outlined in the formation of Malaysia between Malaya, Sabah, and Sarawak.

Sabah Chief Minister Hajiji Noor, in his response to certain West Malaysian politicians who instil fear within the federation by perceiving the demands of East Malaysian states for the Malaysia Agreement to be fulfilled, especially in achieving parity in the Parliament of Malaysia, as an attempt to outwit West Malaysian political influences where both Borneo states are always at a loss in challenging any bill detrimental to them, said the narratives made by West Malaysian politicians suggesting divisions like a "Borneo Bloc" should be corrected, as they undermine national unity. In 2025, the Sarawak State Legislative Assembly approved a motion supporting the proposed increase in state seats, which further requires an amendment to the Federal Constitution, with further discussions regarding the proposed increase in state seats to be tabled in the Parliament in July 2026. The Persatuan Intelektual Pribumi Sarawak (Perantis) has called on the federal government to table a bill to increase the number of parliamentary seats without delaying further following the gazettement of the Constitution (Amendment) Act 2022, which came into force on 11 February 2022 and which formally recognised the Malaysia Agreement in the Federal Constitution. He added, "The recognition cannot be merely symbolic; both regions' positions as equal partners within the federation must be reflected through the structure of power in the Parliament of Malaysia by restoring the one-third seat ratio with at least 29 additional parliamentary seats that are required for both Sabah and Sarawak to restore the balance of representation as agreed before Singapore left Malaysia". On 9 March 2026, an article was subsequently published in the Jesselton Times as a response to several West Malaysian quarters who were belittling and perceiving Sabah's and Sarawak's rights as a "political narrative" rather than the "original arithmetic of the federation foundation". Sarawak United Peoples' Party (SUPP) Stakan Branch chairman Sim Kiang Chiok also supported the decision to balance parliamentary seats to reflect the geographical realities of the two sides, in line with the spirit and intent of the Malaysia Agreement, which recognises both Bornean states as equal partners in the federation formation, where he also urged the EC to expedite the delineation process for the proposal to be tabled in Parliament and approved without any delays.

On 11 September 2026, during a committee meeting for the implementation and the restoration of the original intent of the Malaysia Agreement between Prime Minister Anwar Ibrahim, Sabah Chief Minister Hajiji Noor and Sarawak Premier Abang Johari Openg, the Malaysian Cabinet tentatively agreed to increase the number of parliamentary seats in both regions in order to re-establish the fundamental principle of representation as outlined in the Malaysia Agreement of 1963. On 22 September, the Sabah and Sarawak Affairs Division (BHESS) began discussions with the EC on the proposed increase in parliamentary seats for the two states.

== Documents ==
The Malaysia Agreement lists annexes of:

Annex A: Malaysia Bill
First Schedule—Insertion of new Articles in Constitution
Second Schedule—Section added to Eighth Schedule to Constitution
Third Schedule—Citizenship (amendment of Second Schedule to Constitution)
Fourth Schedule—Special Legislative Lists for Borneo States and Singapore
Fifth Schedule—Additions for Borneo States to Tenth Schedule (Grants and assigned revenues) to Constitution
Sixth Schedule—Minor and consequential amendments of Constitutions
Annex B: The Constitution of the State of Sabah
The Schedule—Forms of Oaths and Affirmations
Annex C: The Constitution of the State of Sarawak
The Schedule—Forms of Oaths and Affirmations
Annex D: The Constitution of the State of Singapore
First Schedule—Forms of Oaths and Affirmations
Second Schedule—Oath of Allegiance and Loyalty
Third Schedule—Oath as Member of the Legislative Assembly
Annex F: Agreement of External Defence and Mutual Assistance
Annex G: North Borneo (Compensation and Retiring benefits) Order in Council, 1963
Annex H: Form of public officers agreements in respect of Sabah and Sarawak
Annex I: Form of public officers agreements in respect of Singapore
Annex J: Agreement between the Governments of the Federation of Malaya and Singapore on common and financial arrangements
Annex to Annex J—Singapore customs ordinance
Annex K: Arrangements with respect to broadcasting and television in Singapore

== See also ==
- 18-point agreement
- 20-point agreement
- 2021 amendment to the Constitution of Malaysia
- Cobbold Commission
- Constitution and Malaysia (Singapore Amendment) Act 1965
- Independence of Singapore Agreement 1965
- Konfrontasi
- Malaysia Act 1963
- Manila Accord
- Separatist movements in Malaysia
- Timeline of Malaysian history
- Proclamation of Singapore
- Vienna Convention on the Law of Treaties

== Notes and references ==
=== Bibliography ===
- Guillemard, Laurence (1934). "British Malaya". Journal of the Royal Central Asian Society. 21 (3): 394. doi:10.1080/03068373408725318 – via Taylor & Francis.
- Report of the Commission of Enquiry, North Borneo and Sarawak, 1962. U.S. Government Printing Office. 1962.
- North Borneo and Malaysia. U.S. Government Printing Office. 1962.
- The Federation of Malaya Year Book. Malay Mail. 1962.
- Press Feature. Malaysia Information Service (Washington D.C.), Embassy of Malaysia. 1962.
- Silcock, Thomas Henry; Fisk, Ernest Kelvin (1963). The Political Economy of Independent Malaya: A Case-study in Development. University of California Press.
- Thomson, James (1964). "Note on Kelantan v. Federation of Malaya (Federal Treaty-making Power)*". International Legal Materials, American Society of International Law. 3 (1): 132. doi:10.1017/S002078290005600X.
- Jayakumar, S. (1964). "Admission of New States: The Government of the State of Kelantan v. The Government of the Federation of Malaya and Tunku Abdul Rahman Putra Al-Haj". Malaya Law Review. 6 (1): 181–188. JSTOR 24861976.
- The Commonwealth Relations Office List. H.M. Stationery Office. 1965.
- Ongkili, James P. (1967). The Borneo Response to Malaysia, 1961-1963. Donald Moore Press.
- Nair, Basskaran (1980). Communication in Colonial and Independent Singapore. Asian Mass Communication Research and Information Centre.
- Trindade, Francis A.; Lee, H. P. (1988). The Constitution of Malaysia, Further Perspectives and Developments: Essays in Honour of Tun Mohamed Suffian. Fajar Bakti. ISBN 978-967-65-0030-4.
- Antolik, Michael (1990). ASEAN and the Diplomacy of Accommodation. M.E. Sharpe. ISBN 978-0-87332-630-8.
- Tan, Kevin (1999). The Singapore Legal System. NUS Press. ISBN 978-9971-69-213-1.
- Chan, Heng Kong (2005). Singapore's Political Economy: A Case Study of Social Costs in a Market Economy. Universal Books. ISBN 978-0-9758014-0-6.
- Green, Richard (2005). The Commonwealth Yearbook 2005. Nexus Strategic Partnerships Ltd. ISBN 978-0-9549629-0-6.
- The Birth of Malaysia: A Reprint of the Cobbold Report, the I.G.C. Report, and the Malaysia Agreement. Sweet & Maxwell Asia. 2008. ISBN 978-967-5040-21-4.
- Mathews, Philip (28 February 2014). Chronicle of Malaysia: Fifty Years of Headline News, 1963-2013. Editions Didier Millet. ISBN 978-967-10617-4-9.
- Tan, Kevin YL (30 April 2015). The Constitution of Singapore: A Contextual Analysis. Bloomsbury Publishing. ISBN 978-1-78225-268-9.
- Kaur, Amarjit; Metcalfe, Ian (22 December 2015). The Shaping of Malaysia. Springer. ISBN 978-1-349-27079-8.
- Tan, Kevin Y. L. (3 August 2018). Constitutional Law in Singapore. Kluwer Law International B.V. ISBN 978-94-035-0173-4.
- Chin, James (1 January 2019). The 1963 Malaysia Agreement (MA63): Sabah and Sarawak and the Politics of Historical Grievances. University of Tasmania. ISBN 978-967-2165-58-3.
- Majid, Norrizan Abd; Daud, Sity (2021). Nation-building in a Plural Society Towards Bangsa Malaysia. Penerbit Universiti Kebangsaan Malaysia. ISBN 978-967-412-775-6.
- Hale, Christopher (21 March 2023). Brief History of Singapore and Malaysia: Multiculturalism and Prosperity: The Shared History of Two Southeast Asian Tigers. Tuttle Publishing. ISBN 978-1-4629-2393-9.
