= Kota Kinabalu Court Complex =

Court in Kota Kinabalu, Sabah, Malaysia

- Kompleks Mahkamah Kota Kinabalu
- Interactive map of the Kota Kinabalu Court Complex area

General information
- Type: Court complex
- Location: No. 1, Kebajikan Road, 88300, Kota Kinabalu, Sabah, Malaysia
- Coordinates: 5°58′01.5″N 116°04′50.6″E
- Groundbreaking: April 2014
- Construction started: 22 July 2014
- Completed: August 2018
- Opened: September 2018
- Inaugurated: October 2018
- Cost: RM177 million
- Owner: Sabah Judicial Department

Design and construction
- Architects: Shah Architect and Chong Ten Lip

Other information
- Parking: 270 lots (19 for judges, 88 for staff at the lower ground, 161 surface car parks, two for disabled people and a parking bay for bus)

Website
- judiciary.kehakiman.gov.my

Kota Kinabalu Court Complex (Malay: Kompleks Mahkamah Kota Kinabalu) is a court complex located on 2.5 hectares (6.25-acre) of land atop Punai Hill in Kota Kinabalu, Sabah, Malaysia.

== History ==
The new court complex began to be constructed on 22 July 2014 through federal-funded project since its groundbreaking in April of the same year at a cost of RM177 million as the replacement of an old single high court building before it was completed in 2018. Although the construction completion was delayed for another few months, the developer managed to saved about RM1.4 million from the RM177 million allocation by the federal government. In April 2019, the Integrated Court System (ICS) being installed on the complex to improve court management.

== Features ==
The new complex design combining three Sabah's ethnic elements, namely the Kadazan-Dusun, Bajau Laut and Murut that also incorporated motifs of the country national flower of Hibiscus rosa-sinensis (Chinese hibiscus), and Sabah's official flower of Rafflesia. The exterior incorporated similar resemblance to the Palace of Justice at Putrajaya. Inside the complex, it has three High Courts, six Magistrates' courts, six Sessions Courts including the Child Sexual Offence Court and a Federal Court.
