= 20-point agreement =

Terms for North Borneo's incorporation into the State of Sabah

The 20-point agreement, or the 20-point memorandum, is a list of 20 points drawn up by North Borneo, proposing terms for its incorporation into the new federation as the State of Sabah, during negotiations prior to the formation of Malaysia. In the Malaysia Bill of the Malaysia Agreement some of the twenty points were incorporated, to varying degrees, into what became the Constitution of Malaysia; others were merely accepted orally, thus not gaining legal status. The 20-point agreement often serves as a focal point amongst those who argue that Sabah's rights within the Federation have been eroded over time.

== Background ==
Under an agreement signed between Great Britain and the Federation of Malaya the issue of self-determination with respect to the peoples of North Borneo and Sarawak formed a challenge to the formation of the Federation of Malaysia. A Joint Statement issued by the British and Malayan Federal Governments on 23 November 1961 announced that before coming to any final decision it was necessary to ascertain the views of the peoples of North Borneo and Sarawak. It was decided to set up a commission to carry out that task and to make recommendations.

The British Government, working with the Federation of Malaya Government, appointed a Commission of Enquiry for North Borneo and Sarawak in January 1962 to determine if the people supported the proposal to create a Federation of Malaysia. The five-man team, which comprised two Malayans and three British representatives, was headed by Lord Cobbold. An inter-governmental committee (The Lansdowne Committee) was appointed to work out the final details of the Malaysia Agreement. Lord Lansdowne served for Britain and Tun Abdul Razak, Deputy Prime Minister of the Federation of Malaya served for Malaya.

The 20 points were written with a view to safeguarding the interests, rights, and autonomy of the people of North Borneo upon the formation of the federation of Malaysia. A similar proposal, with certain differences in content, was made by Sarawak, and is commonly referred to as the 18-point agreement.

Attention is often drawn to these memoranda by those who believe that their principles were not subsequently adhered to after federation. There have been numerous calls for the 20-point memorandum to be reviewed so as to take into account social, economic, and political changes over time.

== Brief timeline of related events ==
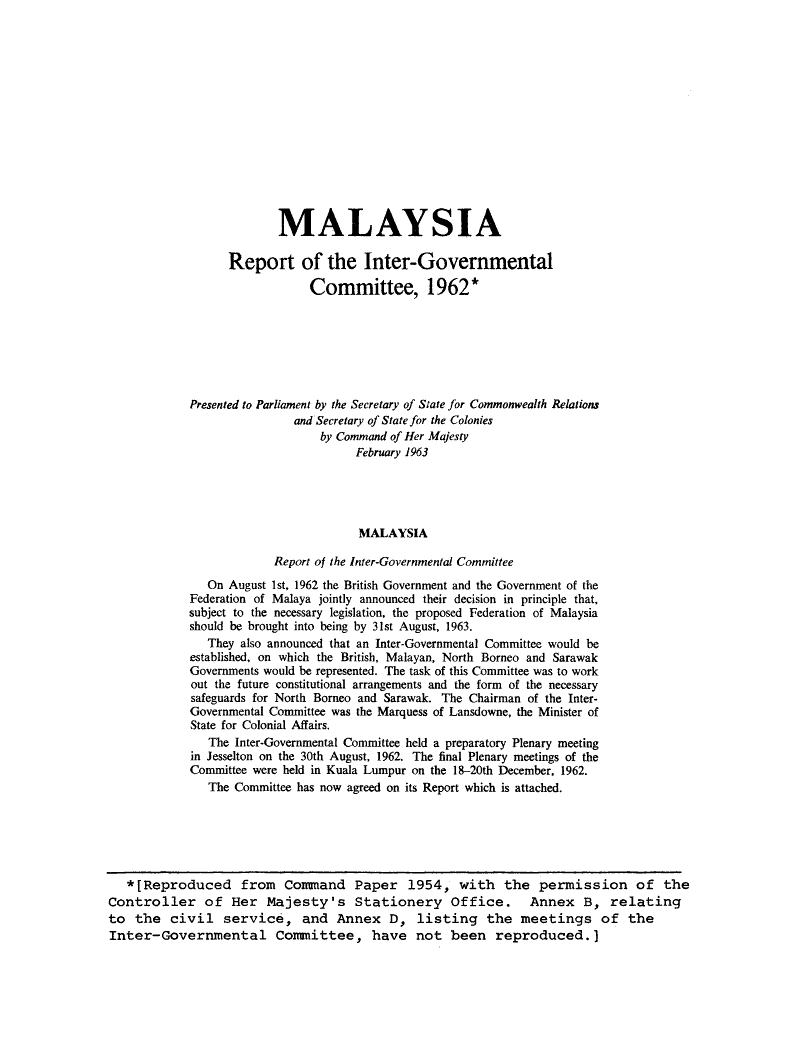
The Report of the Inter-Governmental Committee. On 1 August 1962

- 17 January 1962: The Commission of Enquiry (Cobbold Commission) was announced to observe the views of the people of Singapore, Sarawak, Brunei and North Borneo.
- 21 March 1962: At a meeting of the Greater Malaysia Committee there was agreement that it would be preferable to wait for the Cobbold Commission, which had been tasked with assessment of support for the proposal in North Borneo and Sarawak, to complete its report, in order to consider its findings before a decision was made on the federation of Malaysia.
- 21 June 1962: The Cobbold Report was completed and submitted to the prime ministers of Britain and Malaya (confidentially). The report concluded that one third fully supported the idea, one third were in favour provided that safeguards were included, and the remaining one third were divided between those who would prefer North Borneo and Sarawak to gain independence prior to the merger and those who rejected the merger outright. The commission's view was - firm support for a federated Malaysia (with transfer of sovereignty within twelve months), incorporating a transitional arrangement in which the British would remain for the first few years.
- 31 July 1962: The British and Malayan governments decided in principle that the proposed Federation of Malaysia should be brought into being by 31 August 1963. An Inter-Governmental Committee (IGC) was to be formed to work on future constitutional arrangements.
- August 1962: The Report was published to all parties. Reportedly, this came as a surprise to North Borneo.
- 13 – 14 August 1962: Donald Stephens convened a meeting of political leaders who drew up a 14-point (later 20-point) memorandum of minimum demands. This gained support from Sarawak.
- 12 & 26 September 1962 (respectively): North Borneo and Sarawak legislative council agreed to the formation of Malaysia on condition that state rights were safeguarded.

== The 20 points ==
Point 1 – Religion
While there was no objection to Islam being the national religion of Malaysia, there should be no State religion in North Borneo, and the provisions relating to Islam in the present Constitution of Malaya should not apply to North Borneo.

Point 2 – Language
- a) Malay should be the national language of the Federation.
- b) English should continue to be used for a period of 10 years after Malaysia Day.
- c) English should be an official language of North Borneo for all purposes, State or Federal, without limitation of time.

Point 3 – Constitution
Whilst accepting that the present Constitution of the Federation of Malaya should form the basis of the Constitution of Malaysia, the Constitution of Malaysia should be a completely new document drafted and agreed in the light of a free association of states and should not be a series of amendments to a Constitution drafted and agreed by different states in totally different circumstances. A new Constitution for North Borneo was of course essential.

Point 4 – Head of Federation
The Head of State in North Borneo should not be eligible for election as Head of the Federation.

Point 5 – Name of Federation
"Malaysia", not "Melayu Raya".

Point 6 – Immigration
Control over immigration into any part of Malaysia from outside should rest with the Central Government but entry into North Borneo should also require the approval of the State Government. The Federal Government should not be able to veto the entry of persons into North Borneo for State Government purposes except on strictly security grounds. North Borneo should have unfettered control over the movements of persons other than those in Federal Government employ from other parts of Malaysia into North Borneo.

Point 7 – Right of Secession
There should be no right to secede from the Federation

Point 8 – Borneanisation
Borneanisation of the public service should proceed as quickly as possible.

Point 9 – British Officers
Every effort should be made to encourage British Officers to remain in the public service until their places can be taken by suitably qualified people from North Borneo.

Point 10 – Citizenship
The recommendation in paragraph 148(k) of the Report of the Cobbold Commission should govern the citizenship rights in the Federation of North Borneo subject to the following amendments:
- a) sub-paragraph (i) should not contain the proviso as to five years residence
- b) in order to tie up with our law, sub-paragraph (ii)(a) should read "7 out of 10 years" instead of "8 out of 10 years"
- c) sub-paragraph (iii) should not contain any restriction tied to the citizenship of parents – a person born in North Borneo after Malaysia must be federal citizen.

Point 11 – Tariffs and Finance
North Borneo should retain control of its own finance, development and tariff, and should have the right to work up its own taxation and to raise loans on its own credit.

Point 12 – Special position of indigenous races
In principle the indigenous races of North Borneo should enjoy special rights analogous to those enjoyed by Malays in Malaya, but the present Malaya formula in this regard is not necessarily applicable in North Borneo.

Point 13 – State Government
- a) the Prime Minister should be elected by unofficial members of Legislative Council
- b) There should be a proper Ministerial system in North Borneo.

Point 14 – Transitional period
This should be seven years and during such period legislative power must be left with the State of North Borneo by the Constitution and not be merely delegated to the State Government by the Federal Government.

Point 15 – Education
The existing educational system of North Borneo should be maintained and for this reason it should be under state control.

Point 16 – Constitutional safeguards
No amendment modification or withdrawal of any special safeguard granted to North Borneo should be made by the Central Government without the positive concurrence of the Government of the State of North Borneo. The power of amending the Constitution of the State of North Borneo should belong exclusively to the people in the state. (Note – The United Party, The Democratic Party and the Pasok Momogun Party considered that a three-fourths majority would be required in order to effect any amendment to the Federal and State Constitutions whereas the UNKO and USNO considered a two-thirds majority would be sufficient.)

Point 17 – Representation in Federal Parliament
This should take account not only of the population of North Borneo but also of its size and potentialities and in any case should not be less than that of Singapore.

Point 18 – Name of Head of State
Yang di-Pertua Negara.

Point 19 – Name of State
Sabah.

Point 20 – Land, Forests, Local Government, etc.
The provisions in the Constitution of the Federation in respect of the powers of the National Land Council should not apply in North Borneo. Likewise, the National Council for Local Government should not apply in North Borneo.

== Controversies ==
=== Point 7: Right of Secession ===
Article 2 of the Constitution of Malaysia states that the Parliament of Malaysia has the right to change the state boundaries or to admit any new states into the federation. However, there is no provision about the secession of states from the federation. However, former International Islamic University Malaysia (PIHE) academic, Abdul Aziz Bari, said that Article 2 of the Constitution also implies that the Malaysian Parliament has the final say on the secession of a state from the federation, as it did to Singapore in 1965. Besides, any suggestions about secession of Sabah and Sarawak from Malaysia would be punishable under Sedition Act.

Jeniri Amir from Universiti Malaysia Sarawak (UNIMAS) stated that Sarawak and Sabah has no right to secede from the federation according to Point 7. However, a separatist group led by Doris Jones said that the meaning of the word "should" as in "There should be no right to secede from the Federation" is only a recommendation as opposed to "shall" which implies a command.

=== Point 18: Name of Head of State ===
In the Malaysia Agreement, the meaning of the term "Governor" included the title of the Head of State of Sabah, which was "Yang di-Pertua Negara". This term was incorporated into the Constitution of Malaysia from 1963 to 1976. However, the Sarawak head of state was named "Yang di-Pertua Negeri" from 1963.

On 27 August 1976, under Article 160 of the Constitution of Malaysia, the term "Governor" was abolished and replaced with "Yang di-Pertua Negeri". This effectively ended the title of "Yang di-Pertua Negara" of Sabah. The Malay translation of the term "State" of Sabah and Sarawak has been "Negeri" (Federated states) instead of "Negara" (Nation) since 1963.

Nevertherless, some groups argue that Sabah and Sarawak should be called "Negara" (Nation), and the head of state called "Yang di-Pertua Negara", on the basis that Sarawak achieved independence on 22 July 1963 and Sabah achieved independence on 31 August 1963 before forming Malaysia together with Federation of Malaya on 16 September 1963. They believe that the head of state of Sabah being known as "Yang di-Pertua Negara" between 1963 and 1976 supports this view.

== See also ==
- 18-point agreement
- Politics of Malaysia
