= 18-point agreement =

Proposed terms to form Malaysia

The 18-point agreement, or the 18-point memorandum, was a list of 18 points drawn up by Sarawak, proposing terms to form Malaysia, during negotiations prior to the creation of the new federation in 1963.

A Commission of Enquiry, headed by Lord Cameron Cobbold, and The Lansdowne Committee, an inter-governmental committee, were appointed to aid in the drafting of the Malaysia Agreement. Lord Lansdowne served for Britain and Tun Abdul Razak, Deputy Prime Minister of the Federation of Malaya, served for Malaya. A similar memorandum, known as the 20-point agreement, was prepared and submitted by North Borneo.

The 18-point agreement, Malaysia Agreement (MA63), and Inter-government committee (IGC) report often serves as a focal point amongst those who argue that Sarawak's rights within the federation have been eroded over time. Questions remain whether these pre-constitutional or foundational documents can be defined as "law" and legally enforceable under Article 160 of the Constitution of Malaysia. Shad Saleem Faruqi, professor of law at the University of Malaya, however, stated that such pre-constitutional documents had been used in other parts of the world to interpret the constitution and domestic laws. In 2021 amendment to the Constitution of Malaysia, Article 160 (2) of the federal constitution was amended with the new definition of the term "federation" where the Malaysian federation is formed in accordance to the 1963 Malaysian agreement in addition to 1957 Malaya agreement. Maximus Ongkili, minister in Prime Minister's department argued that such amendment gives legal basis to other pre-constitutional documents such as 18-point agreement, 20-point agreement and IGC report because these documents are found as appendices under MA63 and Malaysia Act 1963.

== Background ==
On 31 July 1962, an agreement was signed between British prime minister Harold Macmillan and the prime minister of Malaya Tunku Abdul Rahman that anticipated the formation of Malaysia by 31 August 1963 with a proposed initial framework of state constitutions of North Borneo and Sarawak as shown in annex and appendices. Lord Lansdowne later reported that North Borneo leaders expressed "great shock" at the announcement of this agreement. On 13 to 14 August 1962, Fuad Stephens and his political leaders from North Borneo drew up a 14 points memorandum in a meeting. These were later expanded into 20 points of minimum demands. Sarawak political leaders later supported the demands by Fuad Stephens and drew up a similar 18-point memorandum. The 18 points were based on the Nine Cardinal Principles of the rule of the English Rajah in 1941 constitution of Sarawak. Both North Borneo and Sarawak leaders pushed their demands through the Malaysian Solidarity Consolidation Committee (MSCC). The legislative council of North Borneo and Council Negri of Sarawak in principle agreed to the formation of Malaysia on 12 and 26 September 1962 respectively as long as their special interests were safeguarded.

According to Michael Leigh, a Sarawak historian, he had found no evidence that such a document had been drafted and presented to "those who were assessing whether or not the population of the Borneo states wished to be part of a larger federation" (Cobbold Commission). J.C.Fong, former Sarawak attorney-general, referred to the 18 points and 20 points as "manifesto" and the "Malaysia Agreement" as the sacred and conclusive document binding all parties to the formation of Malaysia. Sidi Munan, who was a political aide for Jugah Barieng from 1966 to 1969, mentioned that the original 18-point agreement document has not been found.

Ghazali Shafie, a former diplomat in Malaysia commented that the representatives from Sabah and Sarawak were not on par in politics or economy with representatives from Malaya and Singapore. The former Sabah state secretary Sipaun mentioned that none of the leaders from Borneo had tertiary education and, therefore were not objectively able to think for themselves. Therefore, British colonial officers had to guide the Borneo representatives on important issues during the negotiations with Malaya. The Malaya plan had always been to admit new members to form a strong central government but the North Borneo leaders believed in a "true" federation with a considerable power going back to Borneo. Some of the negative points detriment to the Borneo states in 18-point or 20-point agreements are point 4: "The head of state shall not be eligible for election as the head of the federation" and point 7: "no right of secession". Another example is that although the 18-points or 20-points mentioned nothing about the status of Borneo High Court, the colonial expatriate officers in Borneo decided to include this aspect in the Malaysian Agreement.

== The 18 points ==
=== Point 1: Religion ===
While there was no objection to Islam being the national religion of Malaysia, there should be no official religion in Sarawak, and the provisions relating to Islam in the present Constitution of the Federation Of Malaya should not apply to Sarawak

=== Point 2: Language ===
a. Malay should be the national language of the federation b. English should be the official language of Sarawak

=== Point 3: Constitution ===
Whilst accepting that the present Constitution of the Federation of Malaya should form the basis of the Constitution of Malaysia, the Constitution of Malaysia should be a completely new document drafted and agreed in the light of a free association of states and should not be a series of amendments to a Constitution drafted and agreed by different states in totally different circumstances. A new Constitution for Sarawak was of course essential.

=== Point 4: Head of Nation ===
The Governor of Sarawak should not be eligible for election as King of Malaysia

=== Point 5: Name of Federation ===
"Sarawak, Federation Of Malaysia"

=== Point 6: Immigration Power ===
Control over immigration into any part of Malaysia from outside should rest with the Central Government but entry into Sarawak should also require the approval of the Sarawak Government. The Central Government should not be able to veto the entry of persons into Sarawak for Government purposes except on strictly security grounds. Sarawak should have unfettered control over the movements of persons other than those in Central Government employ from other parts of Malaysia into Sarawak.

=== Point 7: Right of Secession ===
There should be no right to secede from Malaysia

=== Point 8: Borneanisation ===
Borneanisation of the public service should proceed as quickly as possible.

=== Point 9: British Officers ===
Every effort should be made to encourage British Officers to remain in the public service until their places can be taken by suitably qualified people from Sarawak.

=== Point 10: Citizenship ===
The recommendation in paragraph 148(k) of the Report of the Cobbold Commission should govern the citizenship rights in Sarawak subject to the following amendments: a) sub-paragraph (i) should not contain the proviso as to five years residence b) in order to tie up with our law, sub-paragraph (ii)(a) should read "7 out of 10 years" instead of "8 out of 10 years" c) sub-paragraph (iii) should not contain any restriction tied to the citizenship of parents – a person born in Sarawak after Malaysia must be federal citizen.

=== Point 11: Tariffs and Finance ===
Sarawak should retain control of its own finance, development and tariff, and should have the right to work up its own taxation and to raise loans on its own credit.

=== Point 12: Head of Government ===
a) The Premier should be elected by official members of Council Negri b) There should be a proper Ministerial system in Sarawak.

=== Point 13: Transitional Period ===
This should be ten years and during such period legislative power must be left with the Sarawak by the Constitution and not be merely delegated to the Sarawak Government by the Central Government.

=== Point 14: Education and Health ===
The existing healthcare and educational system of Sarawak should be maintained and for this reason it should be under Sarawak control.

=== Point 15: Constitutional safeguards ===
No amendment modification or withdrawal of any special safeguard granted to Sarawak should be made by the Central Government without the positive concurrence of the Government of Sarawak. The power of amending the Constitution of the Sarawak should belong exclusively to the people in the Sarawak.

=== Point 16: Representation in Parliament ===
This should take account not only of the population of Sarawak but also of its size and potentialities and in any case should not be less than that of North Borneo and Singapore.

=== Point 17: Name of Head of Sarawak ===
The Governor of Sarawak

=== Point 18: Land, Forests, Local Government, etc. ===
The provisions in the Constitution of the Malaysia in respect of the powers of the National Land Council should not apply in Sarawak. Likewise, the National Council for Local Government should not apply in Sarawak

== Differences from the North Borneo's 20-point agreement ==
=== Language ===
Sarawak requested that English be the official language of Sarawak, but did not request that the Malay language should also be included as one of the official languages, unlike its North Borneo counterparts.

=== Head of State ===
Sarawak requested that the Head of State should be chosen from any of the indigenous people in Sarawak, where methods will be worked out later. Meanwhile, North Borneo did not mention this process while only stating that the Head of State should be styled as "Yang di-Pertua Negara".

=== Immigration ===
Sarawak stated its intention to control of immigration of people from outside Malaysia but did not mention people from other parts of Malaysia, unlike North Borneo which intended to control immigration from other countries and from other states in Malaysia.

=== Borneonisation ===
Sarawak explicitly stated that Sarawakians should be appointed to federal posts based in Sarawak.

=== Citizenship ===
Both Sarawak and North Borneo requested that to be eligible for Malaysian citizenship, a person should stay in Malaysia for at least seven out of ten years prior to citizenship application. Meanwhile, North Borneo removed additional two requirements to be a citizen of Malaysia: five years residency requirement for citizens of British and its colonies and a person can only become a citizen by operation of law after the formation of Malaysia when one of their parents was a citizen or a permanent resident.

=== Finance ===
Sarawak only asked for three guarantees, namely a development fund, a formula ensuring adequate revenue to the State, and a gradual increase of taxation until the Malayan taxation levels. Meanwhile, North Borneo asked for control of its own finances, development, and tariff.

=== Representations in the Federal Parliament ===
Sarawak proposed to use 13th schedule of the Constitution of Malaya to determine the representation of Sarawak within the Malaysian Parliament. Sarawak also requested adequate ministerial representatives within the federal cabinet. Meanwhile, North Borneo requested that its own representations should not be less than Singapore's, while taking into account the size and potentiality of North Borneo.

=== State Government ===
Sarawak asked for a Chief Minister and a membership system. Meanwhile, North Borneo asked for a Prime Minister and a ministerial system.

=== Transitional period ===
Sarawak requested that federal powers should be delegated to Sarawak during the transitional period of three to five years. Meanwhile, North Borneo asked for a seven-year transitional period. During this period, the legislative power will be delegated to North Borneo by the constitution, instead of by the federal government.

=== Education ===
Sarawak requested Sarawak National Education Policy should be safeguarded. Meanwhile, North Borneo requested to put the educational matters under state control, and to maintain its own existing educational system.

== Inclusion into the 1963 Malaysian Constitution ==
The inter-governmental committee (IGC) was set up to work out the ways to insert the details into the Malaysian constitution. The final IGC report was published in February 1963. The IGC report contained the demands by North Borneo and Sarawak as stipulated in 20-point and 18-point agreements respectively. The Council Negri of Sarawak endorsed the IGC report on 8 March 1963. Meanwhile, the legislative council of North Borneo endorsed the report on 13 March. On 9 July 1963, the Malaysia Agreement was signed in London. On 22 July 1963, Malaysia Act 1963 was passed in the British House of Commons.

Malaysia was formed on 16 September 1963. Malayan Constitution was amended and later become the Constitution of Malaysia. It incorporates some recommendations by the Inter-governmental Committee (IGC) report, but excludes the clause on rights of cession and the nine cardinal principles of good governance by the Brooke government in 1941 constitution of Sarawak.

Article 161E of the Malaysian Constitution stated the governors of North Borneo and Sarawak should be consulted before the amendments of the following aspects in the constitution: citizenships in the Borneo States, appointment of judges and jurisdictions of High Court in Borneo, jurisdictions of the Borneo state legislative assemblies, financial arrangements between the federal government and the Borneo States, the use of religion, languages, and special treatment of the natives in the Borneo States, allocations of the number of MPs in the Borneo States before the end of August 1970.

=== Citizenship ===
Malaysian citizenship will be automatically given to those who are born and normally reside in Sarawak. Those who do not born in Sarawak or any other parts of Malaysia, but had resided for the past seven out of ten years in Sarawak or in other parts of Malaysia, combined with good manners, shall also be granted citizenship of Malaysia.

Article 153 stated that the King (Yang di-Pertuan Agong) would protect the special position of the Malays and other native communities in Sabah and Sarawak with additional provisions in Article 161A

=== Education ===
Although education is put on the federal list, Sarawak still retains control on this matter. Mastery of the Malay language is not a requirement for applications for opportunities in religious or other types of education. Article 161 states that the federal parliament can only start making laws restricting the usage of the English language in the Borneo States ten years after the formation of Malaysia.

=== Emergency powers ===
The Malaysian federal parliament has unlimited powers when state of emergency is proclaimed.

=== Immigration ===
Although immigration is put under the federal list, the federal government should not allow a person into Sarawak without the approval of government of Sarawak.

=== Federal constitution ===
Two-thirds majority in the House of Representatives is required to amend the federal constitution.

=== House of Representatives ===
Sarawak was allocated 24 out of 159 members of parliament into the House of Representatives.

=== Federal Senate ===
Sarawak is represented by two members in the Federal Senate.

=== Legal Department ===
Sarawak will have a legal department with a state attorney-general and a State Officer appointed after the consultation with the federal government.

Article 146A stated that the branch of Judicial and Legal Service Commission in Borneo States should consists of Chief Justice of High Court of Borneo, legal advisors of the Borneo States, chairman of the state public service commission in each of the Borneo States, and another two people appointed by the federal government for this Commission.

=== Religion ===
The Malaysian federal constitution guarantees religious freedom. Article 161D stated that a two-thirds majority is required in the Council Negri to pass any law that restricts or controls the propagation of other religions among Muslims. Article 161C stated that federal law should not provide any financial assistance for establishing Muslim institutions or religious education in the state without approval from the government of Sarawak.

=== Sarawak Constitution ===
Sarawak continues to name its Executive Council the "Supreme Council" and its Legislative Assembly the "Council Negri". The Yang di-Pertuan Agong (King) appoints Sarawak's head of State after consulting with the Chief Minister of Sarawak.

=== State list ===
Sarawak has the sole power to pass laws regarding Muslim Law, Native Law and Customs, land, agriculture and forestry, local government and services, electricity, the state works and water, state machinery, state holidays, turtles, and riverine fishing.

Sarawak has the power to impose sales tax under the State list, as stated in Article 95B. Article 110 stated that Sarawak is eligible to receive taxes, fees, and other sources of revenue collected in the state as listed in Part III of the Tenth Schedule of the federal constitution. Article 112C mentioned the grants eligible to be received by Sarawak according to Part IV of the Tenth Schedule, and eligible receipt of taxes, fees, and dues as stated in Part V of the Tenth Schedule. Article 112D stated that special grants for Sarawak may be reviewed from time to time by the federal and the state government according to Clause 4 of the Part IV of the Tenth Schedule. However, Article 111 restricts the ability of Sarawak to borrow unless authorised by state law. Meanwhile, the state law can only allow Sarawak to borrow with the authorisation of the federal government or borrow from banks or other financial institutions with a loan period of not more than five years, after approval from the federal government.

Article 112 restricts the power of the state government to make additions or alter its own establishments in the state without the approval of the federal government especially if the alteration will increase the liability of the federation in paying out pensions, gratuities or allowances. Article 95D excluded Sarawak from laws regarding local government and lands passed in the federal parliament. Article 95E excluded Sarawak from national plans for land utilisation, local government, and development.

=== Concurrent list ===
The federal government and government of Sarawak jointly manage social welfare, scholarships, national parks, animal husbandry, town and country planning, public health and sanitation, and drainage and irrigation.

== Other aspects ==
All the British expatriates in Sarawak had signed a four-year contract to serve with the government of Sarawak until August 1967. However, all three expatriates were purged from the Supreme Council and Council Negri of Sarawak by August 1966 with compensation. The remaining 300 expatriate officers would not have their contracts renewed by 1967 and all of them would be replaced by local personnel by October 1967.

== See also ==
- 20-point agreement
- Malaysia Act 1963
