= Wong Pow Nee =

Malaysian politician and diplomat

Yang Berbahagia Tan Sri Dato' Seri Utama Wong Pow Nee PMN DUPN PPM
- 王保尼
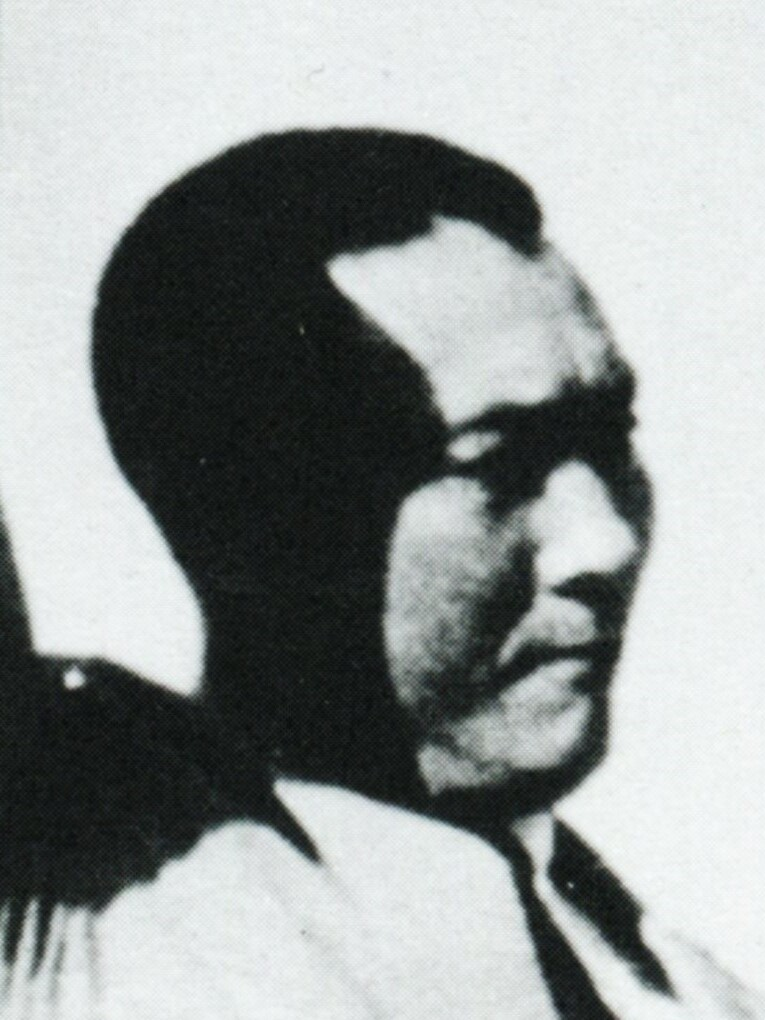
- Portrait, c. pre-1963

1st Chief Minister of Penang
- In office 31 August 1957 – 12 May 1969
- Governor: Raja Uda; Syed Sheh Shahabudin; Syed Sheh Barakbah
- Preceded by: Position established
- Succeeded by: Lim Chong Eu
- Constituency: Bukit Mertajam
- Majority: 4,108 (1955); 2,435 (1959); 1,050 (1964)

Personal details
- Born: 7 October 1911 Bukit Mertajam, Province Wellesley, Straits Settlements
- Died: 31 August 2002 (aged 90) George Town, Penang, Malaysia
- Party: Radical (1953–1955); MCA (after 1955)
- Other political affiliations: Alliance (1953–1973); BN (after 1973)
- Spouses: Agnes Lim Meng Hong (m. 1942; died 1945) Elizabeth Law Siew Khim (m. 1949)
- Children: 10
- Education: St. Xavier's Institution
- Occupation: Politician; diplomat; teacher
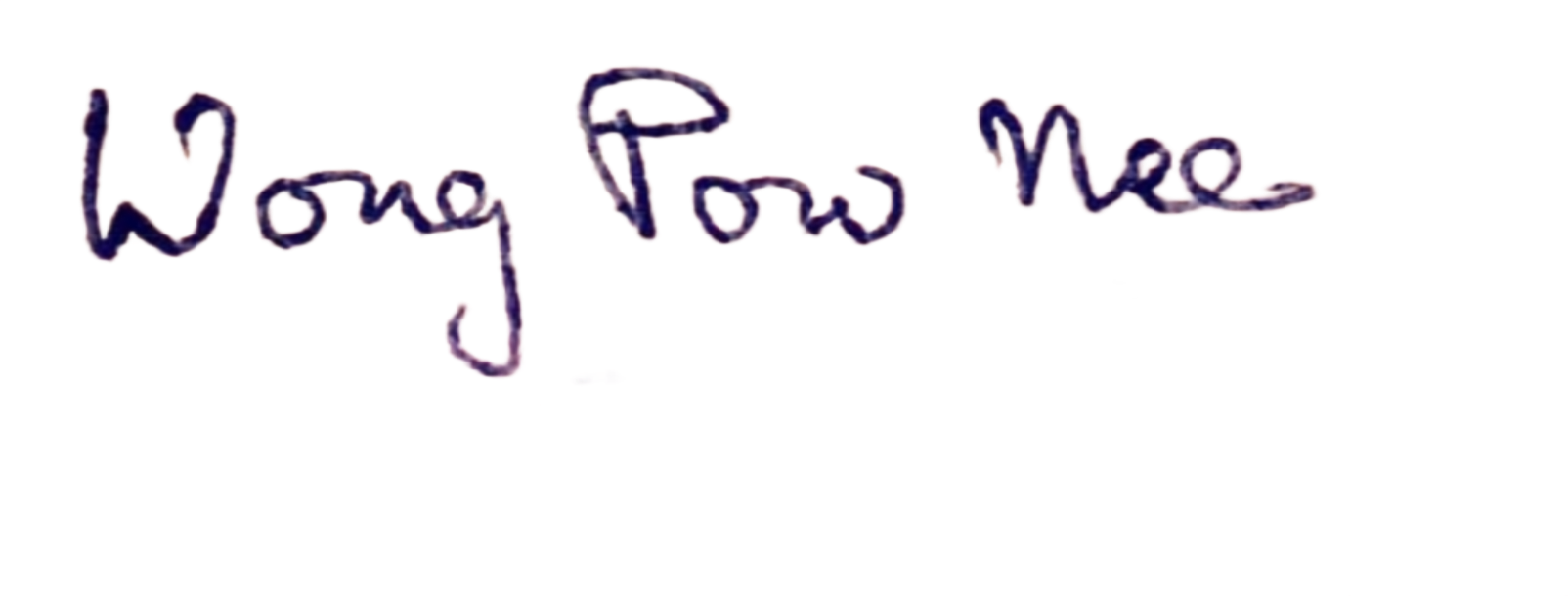
- Signature
- Other offices: 1970–1975: Malaysian Ambassador to Italy; 1962: Member of the Cobbold Commission; 1953–1957: Member of the Bukit Mertajam Town Council

Wong Pow Nee (7 October 1911 – 31 August 2002) was a Malaysian politician and diplomat. He was Penang's first Chief Minister, serving from 1957 to 1969 and Malaysia's first Ambassador to Rome.

== Early history ==
He was born in Bukit Mertajam, Penang, as the son of ethnic Penangite Chinese parents of Hakka descent, namely Cecilia Foo Nguk Yin and John Wong Ee Chin, a hardworking timber merchant cum building developer who both were of the Catholic faith.

He was firstly educated at Jit Sin Chinese Primary School, then he went on to the Anglo-Chinese School and after that, he finished his secondary education St. Xavier's Institution from which he graduated in 1933.

Instead of pursuing further studies abroad, Wong Pow Nee went to work as a clerk at the Bukit Mertajam Catholic Benevolent Society. In 1935, he took up a clerical position with the Sin Ban Guan Bus Company, but the company folded not long after and Wong Pow Nee embarked on a very different career. Between 1937 and 1943, he taught English at St. Mary's Mission School at Permatang Tinggi. In 1945, he taught English at Kim Sen Primary School in Bukit Mertajam. At the same time he enrolled in a Teachers Training Course from which he graduated in 1947.

== Politics and public service ==
In 1953, he stood for elections in the first Bukit Mertajam Town Council (precusor authority of the Seberang Perai City Council) elections, having reluctantly accepted the nomination of villagers who insisted on being represented by him. He won a seat on the Council under Lim Chong Eu's Radical Party, formed earlier in 1951. In 1955, together with Lim Chong Eu, he joined the Malayan Chinese Association following the bad defeat of the Penang Radical Party which was defeated by the newly formed Alliance, and was re-elected to the Council under the Alliance party, after having successfully campaigned against independent candidate, M. P. L. Yegappan.

In 1957, he was appointed as the first Chief Minister of Penang and delivered the Proclamation of Independence at the Esplanade on 31 August in front of a large crowd, after Tunku Abdul Rahman had done the same simultaneously in Stadium Merdeka, Kuala Lumpur.

He was a member of the Cobbold Commission formed in 1962 that ascertained the views of residents in Sabah (then North Borneo) and Sarawak about joining the Federation of Malaysia preparing the framework for the eventual incorporation of Sabah and Sarawak in 1963. Lord Cobbold headed the Commission. Other members of the Commission assisting him, together with Wong Pow Nee, were Tan Sri Ghazali Shafiee, Sir Anthony Abell and Sir David Watherston. The result of their work was the Cobbold Commission Report 1962. Later, he also read out the proclamation of the formation of Malaysia at the Esplanade (Padang Kota Lama), George Town on 16 September 1963.

In 1969, he failed in his bid to retain the Bukit Mertajam seat and was defeated by the Gerakan candidate, Dato' Ooh Chooi Cheng (Chinese: 余水清; pinyin: Yú Shuǐqīng).

As a result of the electoral defeat, he suffered a heart attack in December of that year but recovered well enough to continue his service to King and country.

In May 1970, he officially handed over the reins of leadership of the Penang Alliance coalition to Tengku Abdul Rahman.

After relinquishing the position of Chief Minister of Penang, Wong Pow Nee served as Malaysian Ambassador to Italy and the Holy See between 1970 and 1975.

== Death ==
Wong died on the 45th anniversary of Merdeka Day on 31 August 2002 at 6.30am, aged 90. He left behind his wife, Puan Sri Elizabeth Law Siew Kim, seven sons and three daughters. He was accorded a state funeral of the highest honour. Among those who came to pay their last respects were Governor of Penang Tun Abdul Rahman Abbas, Chief Minister Tan Sri Koh Tsu Koon, Deputy Chief Minister Datuk Hilmi Yahaya and members of Penang's State Executive Committee.

A memorial was held by Hakka Connextion on Merdeka Day, 31 August 2007. A photo exhibition memorialising the struggles and achievements was hosted from 15 September 2012 by Federation of Hakka Associations of Malaysia at the Penang Hakka Association building in Burmah Road, George Town.

== Election results ==
Penang Settlement Council
Year	Constituency	Candidate	Votes	Pct	Opponent(s)	Votes	Pct	Ballots cast	Majority	Turnout
1955	Bukit Mertajam	Wong Pow Nee (MCA)	4,966	82.62%	Muthupalaniyappa Yegapan (IND)	858	14.27%	6,099	4,108	79.28%
1955	Bukit Mertajam	Wong Pow Nee (MCA)	4,966	82.62%	Ng Chye Gaik	187	3.11%	6,099	4,108	79.28%

Penang State Legislative Assembly
Year	Constituency	Candidate	Votes	Pct	Opponent(s)	Votes	Pct	Ballots cast	Majority	Turnout
1959	N04 Bukit Mertajam	Wong Pow Nee (MCA)	4,221	70.27%	Kang Eng Wah (Lab)	1,786	29.73%	6,120	2,435	67.98%
1964	N04 Bukit Mertajam	Wong Pow Nee (MCA)	3,967	42.46%	Tan Chong Boo (Lab)	2,917	31.22%	9,653	1,050	80.86%
1964	N04 Bukit Mertajam	Wong Pow Nee (MCA)	3,967	42.46%	Ooi Chooi Cheng (UDP)	2,458	26.31%	9,653	1,050	80.86%
1969	N04 Bukit Mertajam	Wong Pow Nee (MCA)	2,678	27.39%	Ooh Chooi Cheng (Gerakan)	7,098	72.61%	10,337	4,420	75.51%

== Honours ==
=== Honours of Malaya ===
- Malaya
  - Commander of the Order of the Defender of the Realm (PMN) – Tan Sri (1958)
- Malaysia
  - Recipient of the Malaysian Commemorative Medal (Gold) (PPM) (1965)
- Penang
  - Knight Grand Commander of the Order of the Defender of State (DUPN) – Dato' Seri Utama (1979)
