= SSMEM1 =

Protein-coding gene in the species Homo sapiens

Identifiers
- Aliases: SSMEM1, C7orf45, serine-rich single-pass membrane protein 1, serine rich single-pass membrane protein 1
- External IDs: MGI: 1922897; GeneCards: SSMEM1

Gene location (Human)
Chr.	Chromosome 7 (human)
Band	7q32.2	Start	130,206,344 bp
Band	7q32.2	End	130,216,844 bp

Gene location (Mouse)
Chr.	Chromosome 6 (mouse)
Band	6|6 A3.3	Start	30,509,848 bp
Band	6|6 A3.3	End	30,520,253 bp
RNA expression pattern
Bgee	Human / Mouse (ortholog); Top expressed in: buccal mucosa cell; left testis; right testis; testicle; sperm; gonad; oocyte; placenta; urinary bladder; subdivision of respiratory system / Top expressed in: seminiferous tubule; spermatid; spermatocyte; embryo; embryo; blastocyst; morula; zygote; islet of Langerhans; ventricular zone; More reference expression data
BioGPS	n/a
Orthologs
Databases	NCBI: entry; OMA: entry
Species	Human	Mouse
Entrez	136263	75647
Ensembl	ENSG00000165120	ENSMUSG00000029784
UniProt	Q8WWF3	n/a
RefSeq (mRNA)	NM_145268	NM_027073; NM_029373
RefSeq (protein)	NP_660311	n/a
Location (UCSC)	Chr 7: 130.21 – 130.22 Mb	Chr 6: 30.51 – 30.52 Mb
PubMed search
- Wikidata
View/Edit Human	View/Edit Mouse

Serine-rich single pass membrane protein 1 is a protein that in humans is encoded by the SSMEM1 gene.

== Gene ==
The gene and intron-exon structure were first predicted through analysis of the complete sequence of human chromosome 7, its initial designation being C7orf45. Human mRNA transcripts were identified through two large scale cDNA cloning efforts, an American effort run out of the Dana-Farber Cancer Institute and Harvard Medical School, and full-length long Japan effort. Later assigned the official symbol SSMEM1, the gene is located on the long arm of chromosome 7 (7q32.2) on the sense strand in humans. The human mRNA transcript is 1171 bp long with three exons.

=== Aliases ===
In humans, SSMEM1 is also referred to as C7orf45. Human SSMEM1 has a clone name of FLJ40316.

=== Expression ===
In humans, SSMEM1 is highly expressed in the testes. In mice, SSMEM1 is expressed in the brain.

== Protein ==
In humans, serine-rich single pass membrane protein 1 is 244 amino acids long with a transmembrane domain region spanning amino acids 35-55. This protein has a domain of unknown function (DUF4636) that spans almost all of the protein (amino acids 1-243). DUF4636 belongs to pfam15468 which is a part of the superfamily cl21285 that is found in eukaryotes and typically 196 to 244 amino acids long. The human protein has a molecular weight of 28036 Da and an isoelectric point of 7.64.
