= Malaysia Act 1963 =

Act of the Parliament of the United Kingdom

Malaysia Act 1963 (Note: Section 6(1).)
- Act of Parliament
- Parliament of the United Kingdom
- Long title: An Act to make provision for and in connection with the federation of North Borneo, Sarawak and Singapore with the existing States of the Federation of Malaya.
- Citation: 1963 c. 35
- Territorial extent: United Kingdom

Dates
- Royal assent: 31 July 1963
- Commencement: 31 August 1963 (Note: Section 1(1).)

Other legislation
- Amends: Federation of Malaya Independence Act 1957
- Amended by: Civil Aviation Act 1971; Statute Law (Repeals) Act 1974; Statute Law (Repeals) Act 1977; International Organisations Act 1981; British Nationality Act 1981; Statute Law (Repeals) Act 1989; Commonwealth Act 2002; Armed Forces Act 2006
- Relates to: British Overseas Territories Act 2002

Status: Amended

Text of statute as originally enacted

Revised text of statute as amended

Text of the Malaysia Act 1963 as in force today (including any amendments) within the United Kingdom, from legislation.gov.uk.

Malaysia Act 1963 (c. 35) (document) at Wikisource and Commons

The Malaysia Act 1963 (c. 35) is an act of the Parliament of the United Kingdom. It came into operation on 31 July 1963.

The act made provisions for the federation of the States of North Borneo, Sarawak and Singapore with the existing States of the Federation of Malaya merge with the states of North Borneo, Sarawak and Singapore and the union was renamed Malaysia. As a result of the act, the Federation of Malaya was renamed Malaysia on 16 September 1963.

Singapore ceased to be a state of Malaysia on 9 August 1965, becoming an independent state instead.

== Subsequent developments ==
Section 6(2) of, and schedule 3 to, the act were repealed by section 1 of, and part XI of the schedule to, the Statute Law (Repeals) Act 1974, which came into force on 27 June 1974.

Section 5 of the act was repealed by section 1(1) of, and part VI of schedule 1 to, the Statute Law (Repeals) Act 1989, which came into force on 16 November 1989.

== See also ==
- British Nationality Act 1981
- British Overseas Territories Act 2002
- Constitution of Malaysia
- Malaysia Agreement was signed on 9 July 1963 at London
