= Mahathir Mohamad =

Prime Minister of Malaysia (1981–2003, 2018–2020)

Yang Amat Berbahagia Tun Mahathir Mohamad DK I (Johor) DK (Kedah) DK (Perlis) DKNS DK I (Brunei) DUK SMN SPMJ SPCM SSDK SSAP SSMT SPNS DUPN SPDK DUNM SBS SUMW DP PIS KmstkNO NPk
- محاضر محمد
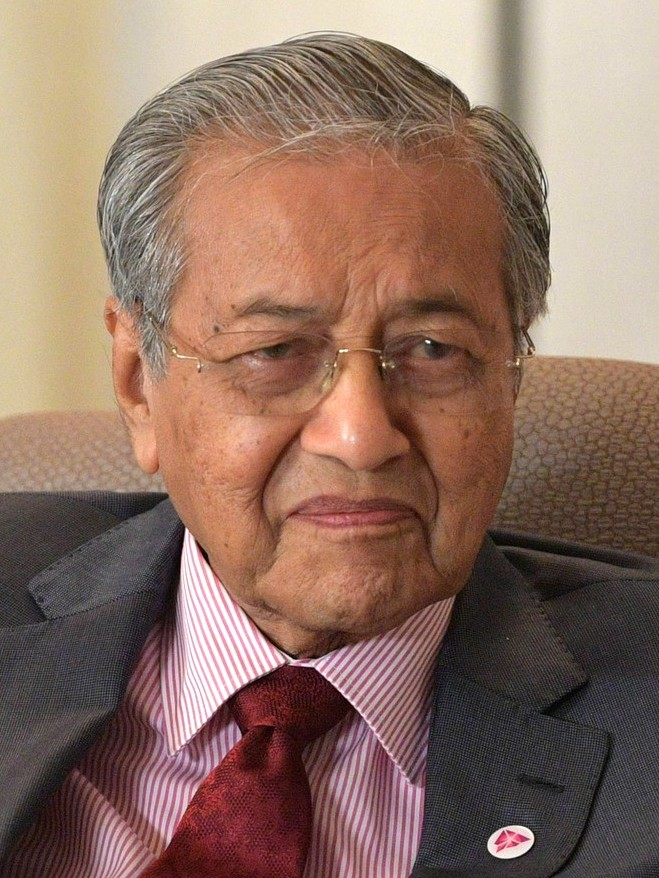
- Mahathir in 2018

4th & 7th Prime Minister of Malaysia
- In office 10 May 2018 – 1 March 2020; Interim: 24 February – 1 March 2020
- Monarchs: Muhammad V; Abdullah
- Deputy: Wan Azizah Wan Ismail
- Preceded by: Najib Razak
- Succeeded by: Muhyiddin Yassin
- In office 16 July 1981 – 31 October 2003
- Monarchs: Ahmad Shah; Iskandar; Azlan Shah; Ja'afar; Salahuddin; Sirajuddin
- Deputy: Musa Hitam; Ghafar Baba; Anwar Ibrahim; Abdullah Ahmad Badawi
- Preceded by: Hussein Onn
- Succeeded by: Abdullah Ahmad Badawi

1st Chairman of the Homeland Fighter's Party
- In office 12 August 2020 – 17 December 2022
- President: Mukhriz Mahathir
- Preceded by: Position established
- Succeeded by: Vacant

1st Chairman of Pakatan Harapan
- In office 14 July 2017 – 24 February 2020
- President: Wan Azizah Wan Ismail
- Preceded by: Position established
- Succeeded by: Anwar Ibrahim

Chairman of the Malaysian United Indigenous Party
- In office 7 September 2016 – 28 May 2020 (Note: Disputed with Muhyiddin Yassin from 24 February to 28 May 2020)
- President: Muhyiddin Yassin
- Preceded by: Position established
- Succeeded by: Muhyiddin Yassin (acting); Position abolished

5th President of the United Malays National Organisation
- In office 28 June 1981 – 31 October 2003
- Deputy: Musa Hitam; Ghafar Baba; Anwar Ibrahim; Abdullah Ahmad Badawi
- Preceded by: Hussein Onn
- Succeeded by: Abdullah Ahmad Badawi

Ministerial roles
- 1974–1978: Minister of Education
- 1976–1981: Deputy Prime Minister
- 1978–1981: Minister of Trade and Industry
- 1981–1986: Minister of Defence
- 1986–1999: Minister of Home Affairs
- 1998–1999: Minister of Finance
- 2001–2003: Minister of Finance
- 2020: Acting Minister of Education

Other roles
- 2003: Secretary-General of the Non-Aligned Movement

Personal details
- Born: Mahathir bin Mohamad; 10 July 1925 (age 101) Alor Setar, Kedah, Unfederated Malay States
- Citizenship: Malaysia
- Party: UMNO (1946‍–‍1969, 1972‍–‍2008, 2009‍–‍2016); BERSATU (2017‍–‍2020); PEJUANG (2020‍–‍2023); Independent (1969‍–‍1972, 2008‍–‍2009, 2016, 2020, 2023); PUTRA (2023‍–‍present)
- Other political affiliations: BN (1946‍–‍1969, 1972‍–‍2008, 2009‍–‍2016); PH (2017‍–‍2020); GTA (2022‍–‍2023); PN (2023‍–‍present) (Note: Informally appointed as the adviser of State Government 4 (SG4)—that consists of Perlis, Kedah, Kelantan, and Terengganu.)
- Spouse: Hasmah Mohamad Ali (m. 1956; died 2026)
- Children: 7 (including Marina, Mokhzani and Mukhriz) (Note: Three of them are the adopted children (Melinda, Maizura, and Mazhar), while the other four are his biological children with Siti Hasmah (Marina, Mirzan, Mokhzani, and Mukhriz).)
- Parent(s): Mohamad Iskandar (father); Wan Tempawan Wan Hanapi (mother)
- Relatives: Mohamed Hashim Mohd Ali (brother-in-law); Ismail Mohamed Ali (brother-in-law)
- Education: Kolej Sultan Abdul Hamid; King Edward VII College of Medicine (MBBS)
- Occupation: Politician; author; doctor
- Awards: Full list
- Website: thechedet.com
- Mahathir Mohamad's voice Excerpt from a recording of Mahathir Mohamad's voice (15 July 1995)

Mahathir bin Mohamad (Jawi: محاضر بن محمد; Malay: [mahade(r) muhammad, -ðe(r)]; born 10 July 1925) is a Malaysian politician, physician and author who served as the fourth and seventh prime minister of Malaysia from 1981 to 2003 and again from 2018 to 2020. He was the country's longest-serving prime minister, serving for a cumulative total of 24 years. His political career has spanned more than 75 years, from joining protests opposing citizenship policies for non-Malays in the Malayan Union in the 1940s to forming the Gerakan Tanah Air coalition in 2022. During his premiership, Mahathir was granted the title "Father of Modernisation" (Malay: Bapa Pemodenan) for his pivotal role in transforming the country's economy and infrastructure. At 101 years old, he is the second-oldest living former state leader in the world and the first Malaysian prime minister to reach that age.

Born and raised in Alor Setar, Kedah, Mahathir excelled at school and became a physician. He became active in UMNO before entering the parliament of Malaysia in 1964 as the Member of Parliament for Kota Setar Selatan, serving until he lost his seat in 1969, subsequently falling out with Prime Minister Tunku Abdul Rahman and being expelled from UMNO. In 1970, he released the book The Malay Dilemma. When Tunku resigned, Mahathir re-entered UMNO and parliament through Kubang Pasu constituency, and was promoted to Minister of Education from 1974 to 1978 and Minister of Trade and Industry from 1978 to 1981. He became deputy prime minister in 1976 before being sworn in as prime minister in 1981.

During Mahathir's first tenure from 1981 to 2003, Malaysia experienced significant economic growth and modernisation, with his government promoting industry-wide privatisation and initiating major infrastructure projects, such as the North–South Expressway and the Kuala Lumpur City Centre. His policies were credited with transforming Malaysia into one of Southeast Asia's most dynamic emerging economies. He was a dominant political figure, securing five consecutive general election victories and maintaining leadership of the UMNO despite internal challenges. Mahathir continued pro-bumiputera policies and oversaw Malaysia's relatively swift recovery from the 1997 Asian financial crisis, aided by capital controls and stimulus measures that diverged from IMF prescriptions. As prime minister, he was a strong proponent of Asian values and alternative development models, and he played a prominent role in the Muslim world.

In 1987, he ordered the detention of numerous activists under Operation Lalang, and his administration was involved in the 1988 Malaysian constitutional crisis, which raised concerns about judicial independence. He supported a constitutional amendment that stripped the royalty of criminal immunity, a move widely regarded as a legal reform strengthening the rule of law. In 1998, the dismissal of deputy Anwar Ibrahim sparked the Reformasi and became a major point of political debate in Malaysia. Critics accused Mahathir of authoritarianism for centralising power and suppressing dissent, while supporters argued that his actions were necessary to preserve national stability.

Mahathir resigned in 2003 after 22 years in office, but remained politically influential and was critical of his successors. He quit UMNO over the 1MDB corruption scandal in 2016, joining BERSATU and leading the Pakatan Harapan opposition coalition to victory in the 2018 general election. During a second tenure as prime minister, he pledged to investigate the 1MDB scandal, combat corruption, and cut spending on large infrastructure projects. He also secured the pardon and release of Anwar Ibrahim. Mahathir resigned in 2020 amidst a political crisis. Despite losing his parliamentary seat in the 2022 general election, he remained active in politics and shifted party affiliation several times. In 2019, Time magazine listed him as one of the world's 100 most influential people. Mahathir's political views have shifted during his life, and are shaped by his Malay nationalism and Islamic religious beliefs.

== Early life and education ==
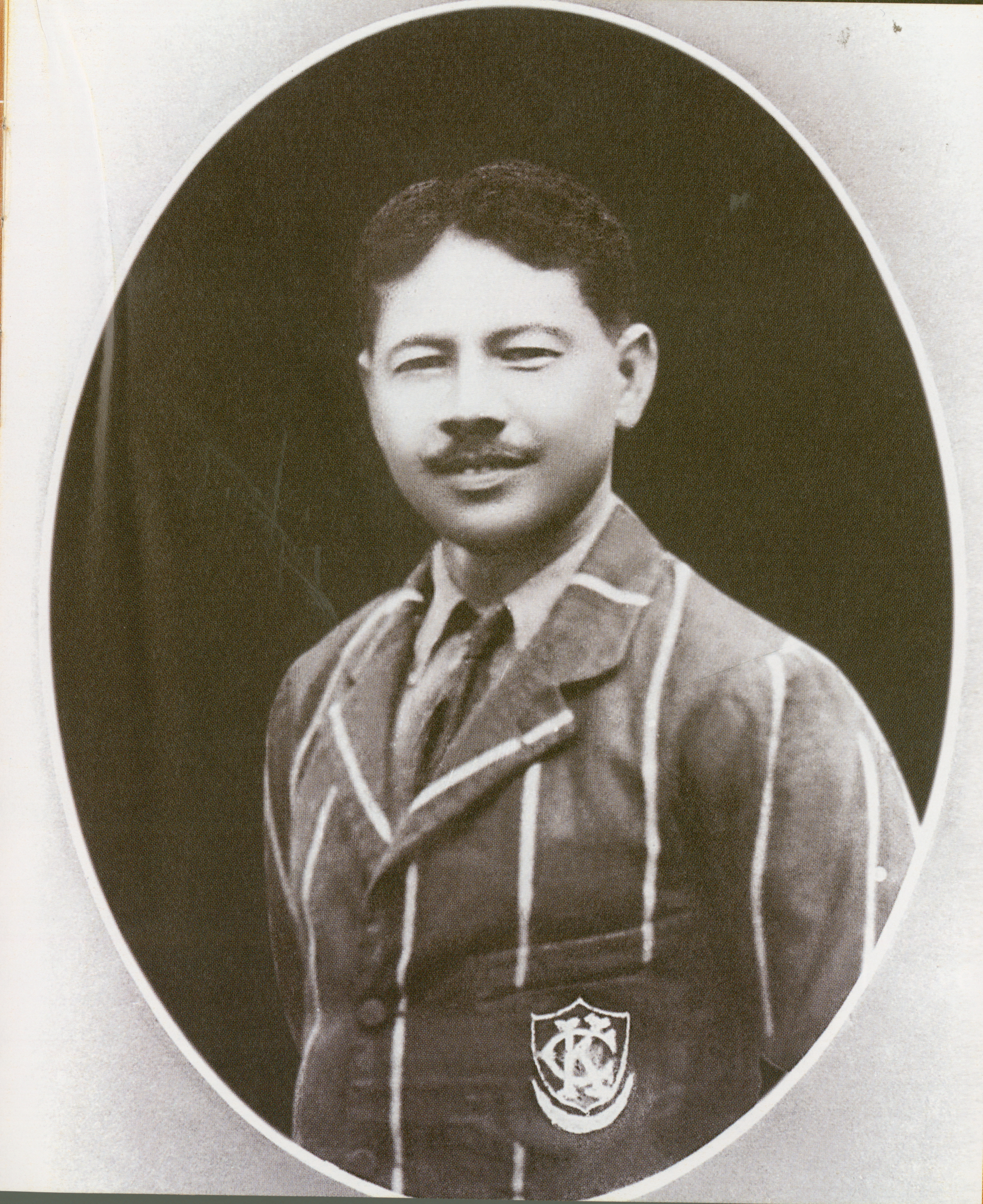
Mahathir's father as headmaster of Sultan Abdul Hamid College. Mohamad Iskandar was born in 1881 and died in 1961

Mahathir was born at his parents' home in a poor neighbourhood at Lorong Kilang Ais, Alor Setar, in the capital of the Malay sultanate of Kedah under a British protectorate, on 10 July 1925. (Note: Mahathir's birth certificate gives his date of birth as 20 December. He was actually born on 10 July; his biographer Barry Wain explains that 20 December was an "arbitrary" date chosen by Mahathir's father for official purposes.) He was the first prime minister who was not born into the aristocracy or a prominent religious or political family. Mahathir's mother, Wan Tempawan Wan Hanapi, was a Malay from Kedah. His father, Mohamad Iskandar, was from Penang of Malay and Indian descent. Mahathir's paternal grandfather had come from Kerala, British India. Some claim that Mahathir's facial features resemble those of Kerala's former Chief Minister Pinarayi Vijayan, although they are not related.

Mohamad Iskandar was the principal of an English-medium secondary school, whose lower-middle-class status meant his daughters were unable to enrol in a secondary school. Wan Tempawan Wan Hanapi had only distant relations to members of Kedah's royalty. Both had been married previously. Mahathir was born with six half-siblings and two full-siblings. His childhood home, with a single shared bedroom and no electricity supply, was later converted to a tourist attraction and opened to the public. During his childhood, Mahathir enjoyed playing snakes and ladders and demonstrated multiple creative talents, including playing the trumpet, interior decorating, and engaging in crafts and carpentry work. He once shared that he was bullied in his youth, recalling how he sold balloons for a small profit but was forced by a stronger peer to use his earnings to buy food for him.

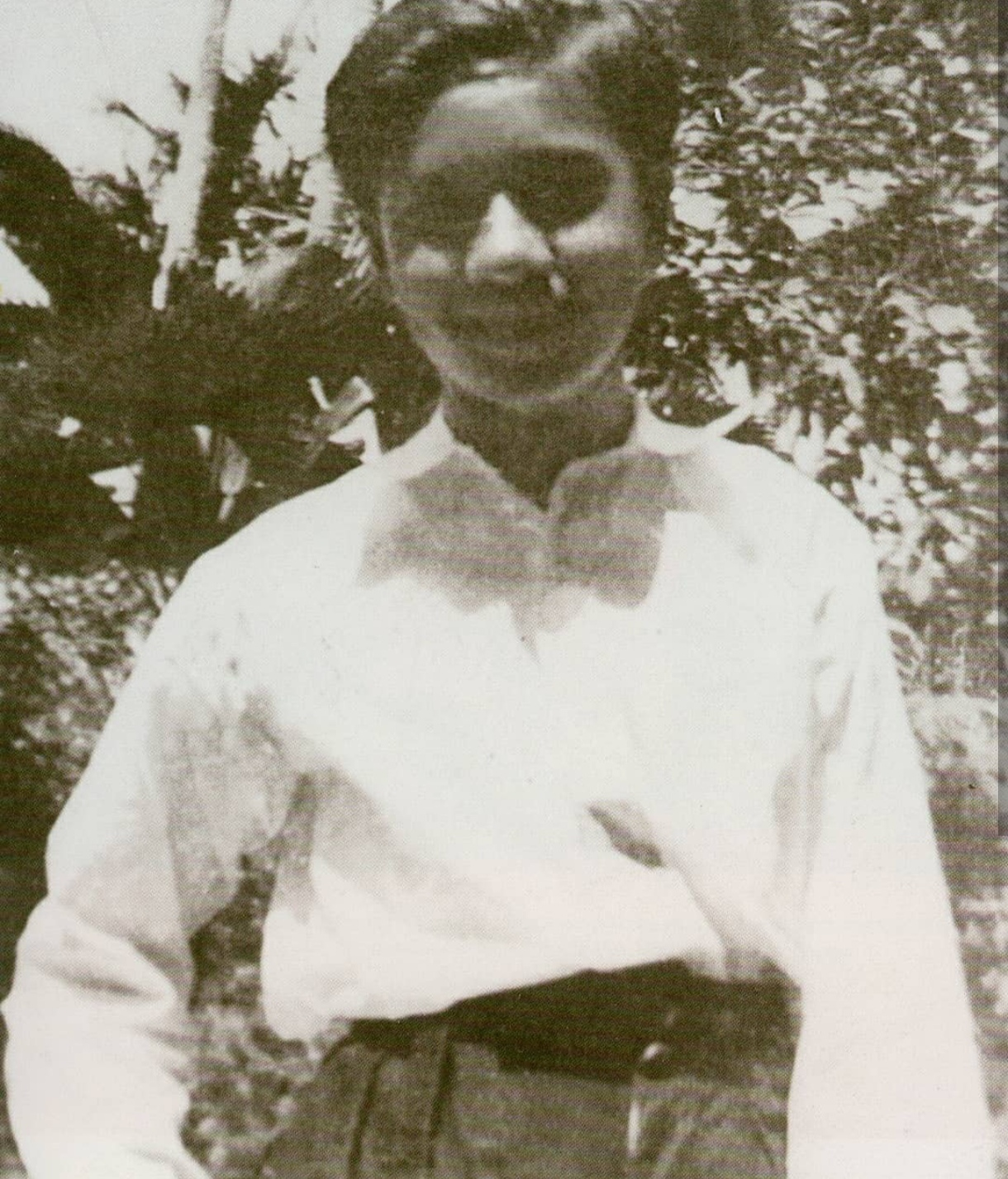
Mahathir in a school uniform, circa 1939

Mahathir began his education at Seberang Perak Malay Boys School, Alor Setar, Kedah in 1930. Mahathir was a hard-working student. Discipline imposed by his father motivated him to study, and he showed little interest in sports. Having become fluent in English well ahead of his primary school peers, including editing the English student newspaper and winning a series of language awards, he won a position in a selective English-medium secondary school Government English School in 1933. Although he was not a sports fan, Mahathir took up rugby during his school days because he liked the sport and wanted to avoid being lazy and weak. With schools closed during the Japanese occupation of Malaya in World War II, he started a small business at Pekan Rabu, selling coffee and snacks such as pisang goreng (banana fritters). Even after becoming prime minister, Mahathir continued to visit Pekan Rabu whenever he travelled to Alor Setar.

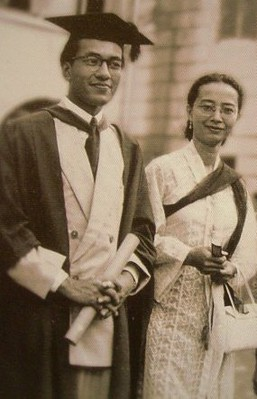
Mahathir and Siti Hasmah in 1953, graduating from University of Malaya (present-day National University of Singapore, resulting after Expulsion of Singapore from Malaysia) in Singapore.

After the war, Mahathir graduated from secondary school with the highest rank and enrolled to study medicine at the King Edward VII College of Medicine in Singapore. Mahathir studied medicine at what was then called the University of Malaya, later renamed the University of Singapore. When the university granted him an honorary degree in November 2018, he said "I will always value my stay in Singapore for nearly six years." During his college years, Mahathir developed a passion for driving, often travelling long distances, including from Singapore to his hometown in Alor Setar, in his convertible. In 1947, Mahathir, writing under the pen name 'Che Det' in The Sunday Times, published an article titled Malay Women Make Their Own Freedom, in which he discussed the struggle of Malay women in the post-war period and stated, "It is up to the men and especially the fathers, to realise that they can no longer confine their womenfolk to the kitchen."

== Medical career (1953–1959) ==
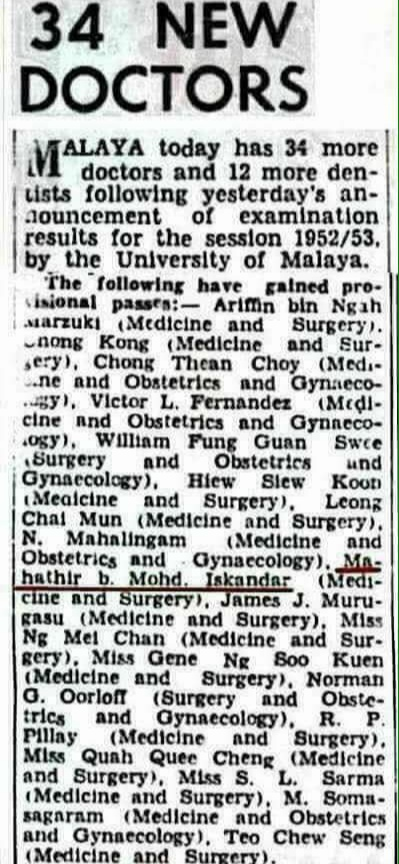
The Straits Times reported in 1953 that Mahathir was among the 34 new doctors graduating from the University of Malaya

After graduating in 1953 from the University of Malaya, Mahathir began his housemanship at Penang General Hospital. In 1954, he was sent to Alor Setar General Hospital before being posted to government clinics in Langkawi, Jitra, and Perlis. During his time in Langkawi in 1955, Mahathir was the island's first stationed doctor, witnessing its underdeveloped state—a memory that later influenced his efforts to transform it into a major tourist destination when he became prime minister.

Reflecting on his early career, Mahathir said he prioritised work over salary, starting with MYR 400.00 as a medical officer before a promotion raised it to MYR 770.00. He then resigned to open his private practice, named "Maha Klinik" (Maha Clinic), while his wife worked as a government doctor for 25 years. Maha Klinik was the first privately owned clinic established by a Malay in Malaysia.

Mahathir acquired the reputation of being a caring doctor, willing to make house calls at any hour, trudging across rice fields in the dark to treat patients. If they could not afford his fee, they settled by installments or paid what they had. He was the town's first Malay physician and a successful one. He built a large house and employed a Chinese man to chauffeur him in his Pontiac Catalina (most chauffeurs at the time were Malay).

Mahathir and Siti Hasmah were also involved in welfare and public health activities. He served as President of the Kedah Tuberculosis Association, visiting Indian workers on rubber plantations to treat the disease, while she volunteered in the Kedah Family Planning Association. With the money from his medical practice, Mahathir indulged in his entrepreneurial streak and invested in property development, tin mining, a franchised petrol station, and a shop to do quick printing–sometimes to rescue Malay businessmen in trouble. He helped found the Malay Chamber of Commerce and served as its director.

== Early political career (1959–1970) ==
After World War II ended and the Japanese withdrew, the British grouped the Malay states and the Straits Settlements into the Malayan Union, and granted citizenship to non-Malays. This caused major backlash from Malays and a wave of Malay nationalism swept across the country. Mahathir became politically activated by these changes, joining protests and activism against the new citizenship policies. Mahathir later argued for affirmative action for Malays at medical college. While at college, he contributed to The Straits Times under the pseudonym "C.H.E. Det" and a student journal, in which he fiercely promoted Malay rights, such as calling for the restoration of Malay as an official language. While practising as a physician in Alor Setar, Mahathir became active in UMNO. His earliest political involvement was in the Kampung Charok Kudong Umno branch, where he made his debut in politics. By the time of the first general election for the independent state of Malaya in 1959, he was the chairman of the party in Kedah.

Despite his prominence in UMNO, Mahathir was not a candidate in the 1959 election, ruling himself out following a disagreement with then Prime Minister Tunku Abdul Rahman. Their relationship had been strained since Mahathir had criticised Tunku's agreement to retain British and Commonwealth forces in Malaya after independence. Tunku opposed Mahathir's plans to introduce minimum educational qualifications for UMNO candidates. For Mahathir, this was a significant enough slight to delay his entry into national politics in protest. He contested in the following general election in 1964, and was elected as the federal parliamentarian for the Alor Setar-based seat of Kota Setar Selatan.

Elected to parliament in a volatile political period, Mahathir, as a backbencher, launched himself into the main conflict of the day: Singapore's future as a state of Malaysia. He vociferously attacked Singapore's dominant People's Action Party for being "pro-Chinese" and "anti-Malay" and called its leader, Lee Kuan Yew, "arrogant". Singapore was expelled from Malaysia in Mahathir's first full year in parliament. In 1965, Mahathir stated in Parliament that Article 153 of the Federal Constitution, which grants special rights to Malays, was a source of shame for the community and would eventually be abolished. Despite Mahathir's prominence, he lost his seat in the 1969 election, defeated by Yusof Rawa of the Pan-Malaysian Islamic Party (PAS). Mahathir attributed the loss of his seat to ethnic Chinese voters switching support from UMNO to PAS. Being a Malay-dominated seat, only the two major Malay parties fielded candidates, leaving Chinese voters to choose between the Malay-centric UMNO and the Islamist PAS.

Large government losses in the election were followed by the race riots of 13 May 1969. Hundreds of people were killed in clashes between Malays and Chinese. In 1968, Mahathir had expressed concern over escalating racial tensions in two newspaper articles, and feared preventative measures would be needed to avoid violence. Outside parliament, he openly criticised the government, also sending an open dissenting letter to Tunku for failing to uphold Malay interests and calling for his resignation. By the end of the year, Mahathir was fired from UMNO's Supreme Council and expelled from the party. Tunku had to be persuaded not to have him arrested.

Expelled from UMNO, Mahathir wrote his first book, The Malay Dilemma, in which he set out his vision for the Malay community. The book argued that a balance had to be achieved between government support for Malays, so that their economic interests would not be dominated by the Chinese, and exposing Malays to sufficient competition. Mahathir saw Malays as typically avoiding hard work and failing to "appreciate the real value of money and property", and hoped this balance would rectify this. Mahathir criticised Tunku's government in the book, which led to it being banned in Malaysia. The ban was only lifted in 1981 under Mahathir's premiership.

== Rise to prominence (1970–1976) ==
In 1971, Mahathir announced his plan to rejoin UMNO, stating he would make a formal statement at an appropriate time; that same year, he also met Prime Minister Abdul Razak Hussein during a visit to Morib. Mahathir rejoined UMNO on 7 March 1972. Recognizing his potential and sharp political acumen, Razak appointed Mahathir as a Senator for Kedah in 1973. Around the same time, Mahathir also became the chairman of Food Industries of Malaysia (FIMA) Sdn. Bhd. In January 1973, as chairman of the FIMA, Mahathir visited a government factory in Pekan Nanas. He faced peaceful protests from over 200 workers demanding better working conditions and wage improvements. After Mahathir spoke to the workers and promised to review their grievances, they dispersed peacefully. He remained chairman of FIMA until 1981, when he became prime minister and was succeeded by Basir Ismail.

Mahathir rose quickly in the Abdul Razak government, returning to UMNO's Supreme Council in 1973. He returned to the House of Representatives in the 1974 election, winning the Kedah-based seat of Kubang Pasu unopposed. He was appointed to Cabinet in September 1974 as the Minister for Education. During his tenure, Mahathir rolled out a new school curriculum for both primary and secondary schools, designed to provide holistic education and cultivate well-rounded individuals. Around this time, he also ceased his private medical practice.

In 1975, Mahathir ran for one of the three vice-presidencies of UMNO. The contest was regarded as a struggle for the party's leadership succession, as the health of Abdul Razak and his deputy, Hussein Onn, waned. Each of Abdul Razak's preferred candidates was elected: former chief minister of Melaka, Ghafar Baba; Tengku Razaleigh Hamzah, a wealthy businessman and member of Kelantan's royal family; and Mahathir. When Razak died the following year, Hussein, as his successor, had to choose between the three men, alongside the Minister of Home Affairs Ghazali Shafie, to be deputy prime minister. Despite their lack of a close relationship, Hussein eventually appointed Mahathir as his deputy.

== Deputy prime minister (1976–1981) ==
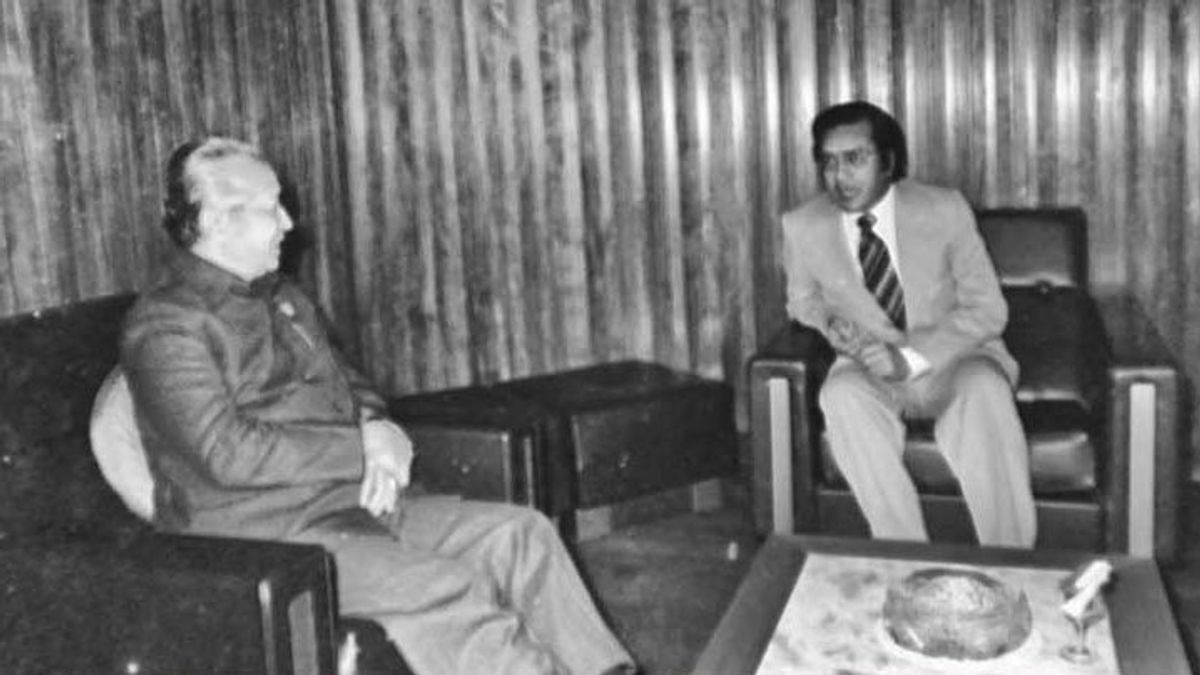
Mahathir and Indonesian President Suharto at Bina Graha, Jakarta, in 1978

After six weeks of indecision, Mahathir was appointed deputy prime minister on 5 March 1976. Several political figures praised his appointment, recognizing his proven ability and experience. The appointment meant that Mahathir was the anointed successor to the prime ministership. In October, Mahathir was appointed to lead a cabinet committee to review the Petroleum Development Act. To address the growing drug problem, Mahathir launched a nationwide anti-drug campaign in 1978 and announced plans to build a large rehabilitation centre on Pisang Island, Johor. He later warned that if the issue was not addressed, drug abuse could lead to the destruction of the nation.

Mahathir is regarded as having been a successful Minister of Education and then Minister of Trade and Industry (1978–81). In the latter post, he implemented a "heavy industries policy", establishing a HICOM, a government-controlled corporation, to invest in the long-term development of manufacturing sectors such as an indigenous car industry. He spent much of his time in the ministry promoting Malaysia through overseas visits. Besides this, as UMNO deputy president, he played a key role in coordinating among the ten component parties of the ruling Barisan Nasional coalition. In the 1978 general election, Mahathir served as BN's election director for the state of Perak.

In September 1978, Mahathir launched the Central Unit of the Federal Industrial Development Authority, a streamlined "one-stop agency" aimed at simplifying the application process for licences, permits, and facilities. Later that month, he led a 31-member trade delegation on a 20-day tour to the United States, aiming to attract American investors by highlighting opportunities in Malaysia, including tax exemptions and other incentives. In June 1979, Mahathir led a 23-member delegation to Pyongyang to sign Malaysia's first trade agreement with North Korea, aimed at exploring opportunities to increase imports of North Korean products. During the visit, he also met with North Korea's supreme leader, Kim Il Sung. In August, Mahathir reported that total approved capital investment in Malaysian companies for 1978 had increased by 38.6 per cent from the previous year, rising from US$441.3 million in 1977 to US$611.4 million; the number of approved projects also increased from 400 to 428, and the number of approved projects for expansion grew from 103 in 1976 and 150 in 1977 to 190 in 1978. In December, Mahathir launched the Manpower Development Board to improve manpower training and to help make the 1980s a decade of resource-based industries.

In 1981, facing health issues and advancing age, Hussein Onn decided to step down, paving the way for Mahathir to take over. In his first speech as UMNO president, Mahathir said that Malaysia and the majority Malays had a bright future, but achieving it required a just, strong, and stable government. A few days before being sworn in, Mahathir told Bernama that there would be no major changes in Malaysia's policies, particularly in foreign affairs, trade, and education, while also emphasizing Islam's continued prominence as the official religion.

== First term as prime minister (1981–2003) ==
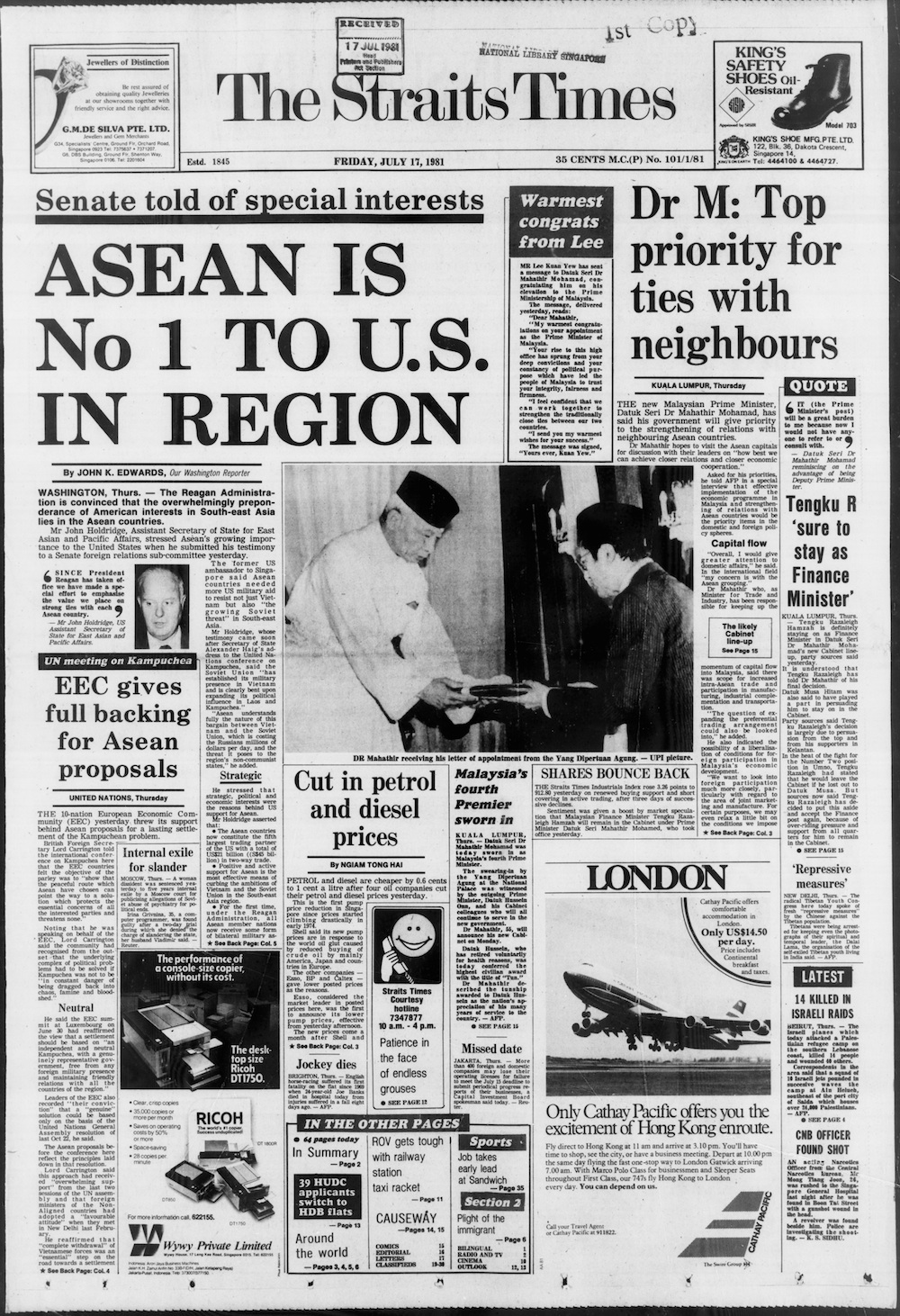
On 17 July 1981, The Straits Times reported that Mahathir had been sworn in as Prime Minister before the Yang di-Pertuan Agong

=== Early years (1981–1987) ===
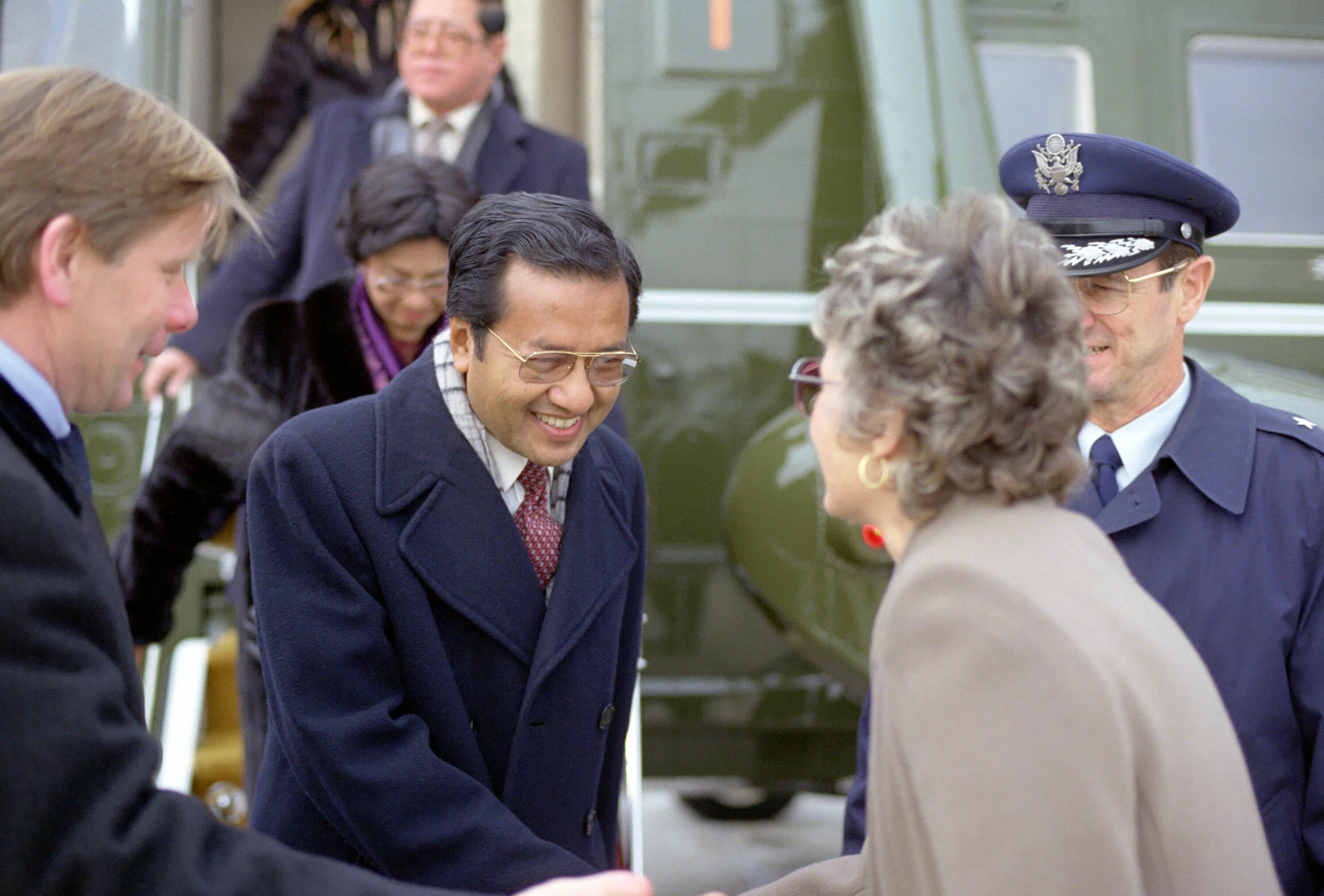
In January 1984, Mahathir visited Andrews Air Force Base in Maryland, United States

Mahathir was sworn in as prime minister on 16 July 1981, at the age of 56. He was the first commoner to hold that office. In an interview, Mahathir remarked that major power rivalry in Southeast Asia is dangerous, but "on the other hand, a lack of U.S. interest is also problematic. It creates the impression that Russia can act as it pleases." U.S. President Ronald Reagan, U.K. Prime Minister Margaret Thatcher, New Zealand Prime Minister Robert Muldoon, Thai Prime Minister Prem Tinsulanonda, and Indonesian dictator Suharto were among the leaders who called to congratulate Mahathir on his appointment.

Two days later, he announced a new cabinet with minor changes, including the transfer of Home Minister Ghazali Shafie to Foreign Affairs. Mahathir appointed Musa Hitam as deputy prime minister. Several days later, on 23 July, Mahathir held his first Cabinet meeting, during which he announced that ministers would have one year to demonstrate progress in achieving national objectives and implementing development programmes.

One of his first acts was to release 21 detainees held under the Internal Security Act. This included journalist Abdul Samad Ismail and Abdullah Ahmad, who was a former deputy minister in the former government but was suspected of being an underground communist. By August 1982, the Mahathir administration had granted pardons to approximately 250 people. Mahathir prioritized a clean and efficient government, initiating the Bersih, Cekap & Amanah (Clean, Efficient, and Trustworthy) campaign to combat corruption, enhance efficiency, and build trust in public service. He also introduced a clock-in system in government departments to ensure punctuality while emphasizing that efficiency should remain the priority. Under calls from opposition leader Lim Kit Siang and others, Musa Hitam, serving concurrently as home minister, lifted the ban on Mahathir's book The Malay Dilemma.

Shortly after taking office, Mahathir, in collaboration with Singaporean Prime Minister Lee Kuan Yew, initiated efforts to standardize Malaysia's time zones. Mahathir introduced and passed the Malaysian Standard Time Act, which came into effect on 31 December 1981, setting the clocks forward by 30 minutes to GMT+8. This legislation, championed by Mahathir, not only unified the time zones of East and Peninsular Malaysia but also aligned the country with regional economic hubs such as Hong Kong, Manila, and Perth.

Mahathir secured a decisive victory in the 1982 general election, strengthening UMNO's leadership with the government's best-ever result since independence in 1957. His development-oriented approach during his first nine months in office resonated with the people, reinforcing their support for his vision of a "clean, efficient and trustworthy" government. Afterwards, he reinforced this vision by implementing measures such as requiring ministers to declare their assets, limiting land applications to one piece per leader, discouraging conflicts of interest with public-listed companies, and advising against ostentation and visits to nightclubs. Mahathir further emphasized this vision by launching the "Leadership-by-Example" campaign in 1983 at Stadium Tun Razak, Kuala Lumpur, encouraging leaders and civil servants to uphold integrity, professionalism, and ethical behaviour in order to inspire public trust and ensure that national objectives were achieved through exemplary conduct.

In 1983, Mahathir undertook one of the first challenges he had with Malaysia's royalty. The position of Yang di-Pertuan Agong, the Malaysian head of state, was due to rotate into either the elderly Idris Shah II of Perak or the controversial Iskandar of Johor, who had only a few years earlier been convicted of manslaughter. Mahathir had grave reservations about the two Sultans, who were both activist rulers of their own states.

Mahathir tried to pre-emptively limit the power that the new Agong could wield over his government. He introduced to parliament amendments to the Constitution to deem the Agong to assent to any bill that had not been assented within 15 days of passage by Parliament. The proposal removed the power to declare a state of emergency from the Agong and placed it with the prime minister. The Agong at the time, Ahmad Shah of Pahang, agreed with the proposals in principle, but baulked when he realised that the proposal would deem Sultans to assent to laws passed by state assemblies. Supported by the Sultans, the Agong refused to assent to the constitutional amendments, which had passed both houses of Parliament with comfortable majorities.

When the public became aware of the impasse, and the Sultans refused to compromise with the government, Mahathir took to the streets to demonstrate public support for his position in mass rallies. The press took the side of the government. A large minority of Malays, including conservative UMNO politicians, and an even larger proportion of the Chinese community supported the Sultans. After five months, the crisis was resolved, as Mahathir and the Sultans agreed to a compromise. The Agong retained the power to declare a state of emergency. However, if he refused to assent to a bill, the bill would return to Parliament, which could then override Agong's veto. In 1984, Mahathir was re-elected unopposed as UMNO president for a second term.

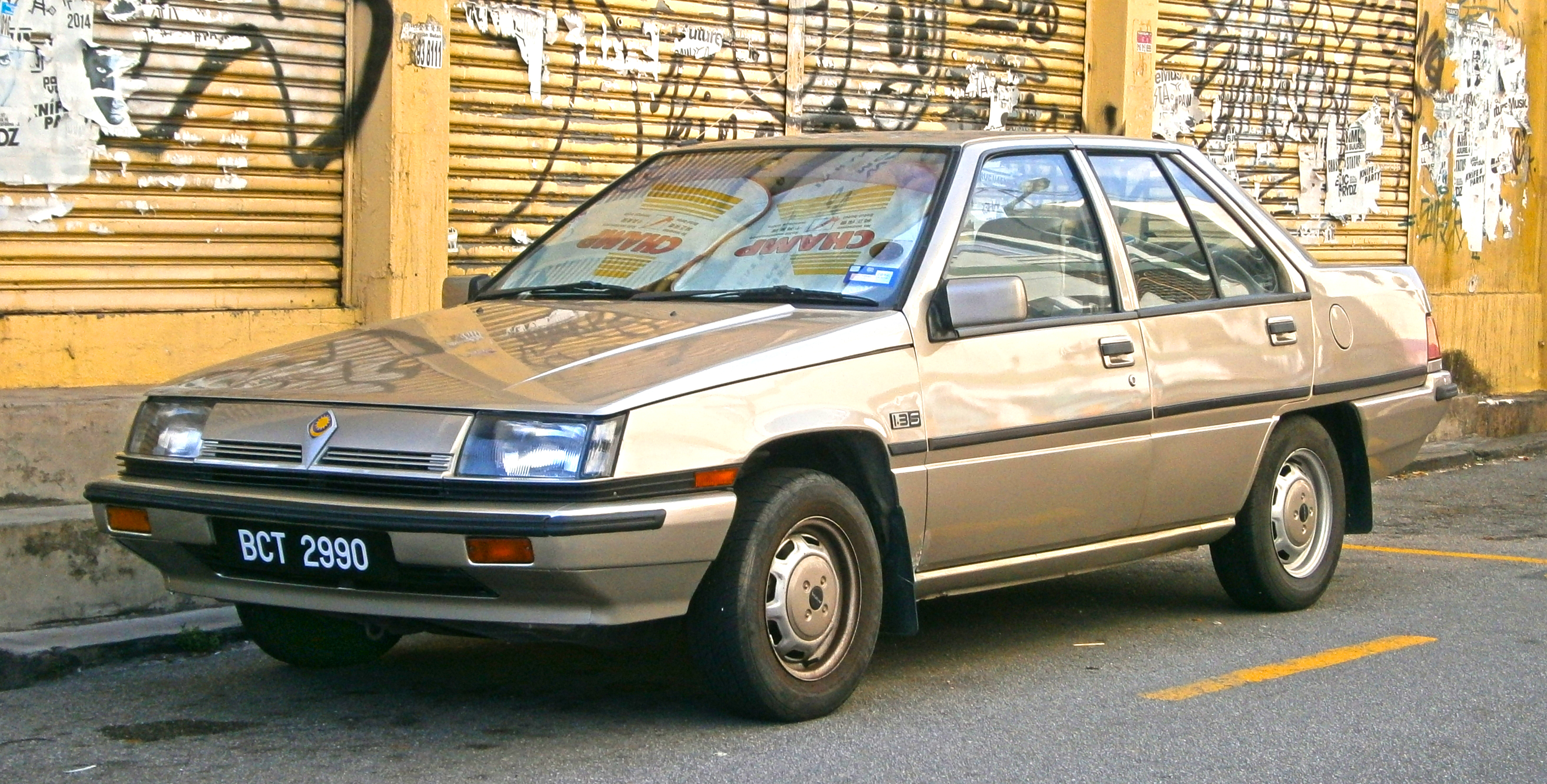
A 1989 model of the Proton Saga. Mahathir believed that an automotive industry could help turn Malaysia into becoming an industrial nation. His government used tariffs to support the development of the Proton as a Malaysian-made car and limited capital outflow of the ringgit to foreign countries.

Mahathir's heavy-industrialisation programme also included Perwaja Steel, established in 1982 as a government-backed project to develop a domestic steel industry. The company subsequently accumulated substantial losses despite continued government support; a 2024 study in the Malaysian Journal of Economic Studies reported accumulated losses of RM9.9 billion between 1982 and its privatisation in 1996, rising to RM15 billion by the time operations ceased in 1999. Mahathir later described Perwaja as a miscalculation on his part while defending the broader record of his industrial policies.

On the economic front, Mahathir inherited the New Economic Policy from his predecessors, which was designed to improve the economic position of the bumiputera—Malaysia's Malays and Indigenous peoples—via targets and affirmative action in areas such as corporate ownership and university admission. Like many of his economic liberal contemporaries such as British prime minister Margaret Thatcher, Mahathir actively pursued privatisation of government enterprises from the early 1980s. Mahathir believed this would provide economic opportunities for bumiputera and their businesses. His government privatised airlines, utilities and telecommunication firms, accelerating to a rate of about 50 privatisations a year by the mid-1990s.

Privatisation generally improved the working conditions of Malaysians in privatised industries and raised significant revenue for the government. One of the most notable infrastructure projects at the time was the construction of the North–South Expressway, a motorway running from the Thai border to Singapore. Mahathir oversaw the establishment of the car manufacturer Proton as a joint venture between the Malaysian government and Mitsubishi. By the end of the 1980s, with the support of protective tariffs, Proton became a profitable enterprise and the largest carmaker in Southeast Asia.

Under Mahathir's leadership, Malaysia implemented strict drug laws, considering drug-related offences a significant national security concern. In 1983, Mahathir launched an Anti-Drug Campaign, enacted the Drug Dependants (Treatment and Rehabilitation) Act, and established Pusat Serenti as a rehabilitation centre for drug dependents. The Cabinet also approved the formation of the Anti-Drugs Committee (JKAD) and the Anti-Drugs Task Force (PPAD) under the National Security Council to oversee anti-drug efforts. As the campaign was officially launched on 19 February, this date was later designated as National Anti-Drugs Day in Malaysia.

These efforts led to a decrease in drug-related cases, from 14,624 in 1983 to 7,596 in 1987. The number of foreign nationals apprehended for drug trafficking also declined, attributed to strict law enforcement and preventive measures. Between 1983 and 1992, more than 120 individuals were executed for drug-related crimes, with an average of 15 to 16 executions per year recorded between 1980 and 1996, including at least 39 executions in 1992. In 1986, Australians Kevin Barlow and Brian Chambers became the first Westerners executed under Malaysia's mandatory death penalty for drug trafficking, despite last-minute clemency appeals from Australia and the United Kingdom. Mahathir defended the decision, emphasizing that Malaysia's strict anti-drug laws applied equally to all, regardless of nationality or background.

In Mahathir's early years as prime minister, Malaysia experienced a resurgence of Islam and conservatism among Malays. PAS, which had joined UMNO in government in the 1970s, responded to the resurgence by taking an increasingly strident Islamist stand under the leadership of Yusof Rawa. Mahathir tried to appeal to religious voters by establishing Islamic institutions such as the International Islamic University of Malaysia which could promote Islamic education under government oversight.

He managed to draw Anwar Ibrahim, the leader of the Malaysian Islamic Youth Movement (ABIM), into the ranks of UMNO. In some cases, Mahathir's government employed repression against more extreme exponents of Islamism. Ibrahim Libya, a popular Islamist leader, was killed in a police shoot-out in 1985. Al-Arqam, a religious sect, was banned, and its leader, Ashaari Mohammad, was arrested under the Internal Security Act. Mahathir comprehensively defeated PAS at the polls in 1986, winning 83 seats of the 84 seats it contested, leaving PAS with just one Member of Parliament (MP). The election saw the BN achieve a landslide victory, securing 148 out of 177 parliamentary seats and control of 11 state assemblies, further consolidating Mahathir's leadership.

In 1987, Mahathir established the Langkawi Development Board and declared the island a duty-free zone. This was followed by the construction of key infrastructure, including the Kuah jetty and Langkawi International Airport in 1988, contributing to the island's transformation into a major tourist destination.

=== Power struggles (1987–1990) ===
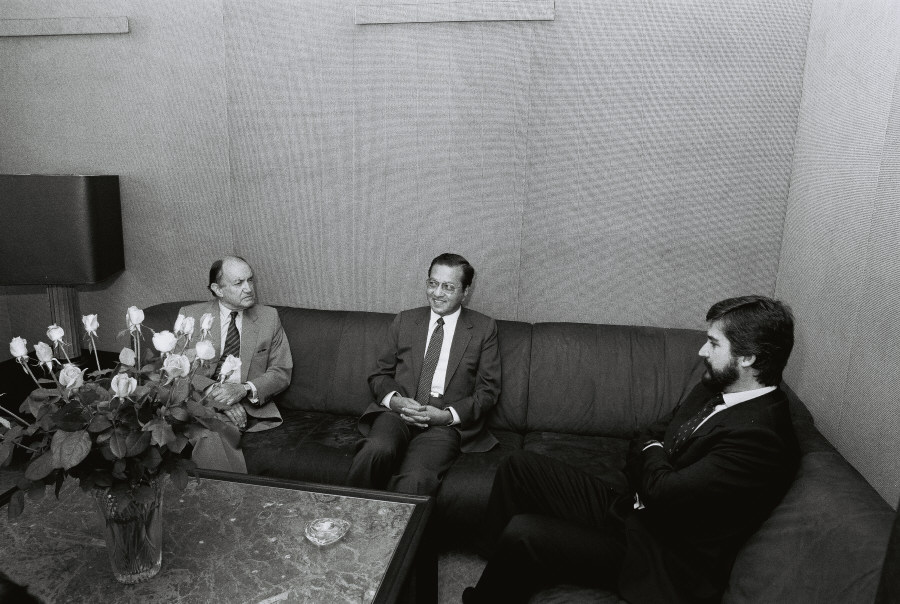
In 1988, Mahathir visited Belgium

In 1987, Tengku Razaleigh Hamzah, who had been demoted from Finance Minister to Trade and Industry Minister, challenged Mahathir for UMNO's presidency, and effectively the prime ministership. Razaleigh's bid was supported by Musa, who had resigned as deputy prime minister the previous year. While once close allies with Mahathir, both fell out with Musa claiming that Mahathir no longer trusted him. Razaleigh and Musa ran for the UMNO presidency and deputy presidency on a joint ticket against Mahathir and his new choice for deputy Abdul Ghafar Baba.

Mahathir's Team A enjoyed the press's support, most party heavyweights, and even Iskandar, now the Agong. However, other prominent figures such as Abdullah Ahmad Badawi supported Team B. In the election, held on 24 April 1987, Team A prevailed. Mahathir was re-elected by a narrow margin, receiving the votes of 761 party delegates to Razaleigh's 718. Ghafar defeated Musa by a slightly larger margin. Mahathir responded by purging seven Team B supporters from his cabinet. At the same time, Team B refused to accept defeat and initiated litigation. In an unexpected decision in February 1988, the High Courts ruled that UMNO was an illegal organisation as some of its branches had not been lawfully registered.

Each faction raced to register a new party under the UMNO name. Mahathir's side successfully registered the name "UMNO Baru" ("new UMNO"), while Team B's application to register "UMNO Malaysia" was rejected. Nevertheless, UMNO Malaysia registered the party as Semangat 46 instead under Tengku Razaleigh Hamzah's leadership. The Lord President of the Supreme Court, Salleh Abas, sent a letter of protest to the Agong, which criticised the prime minister for his comments on the judiciary and called for them to be stopped. Mahathir then suspended Salleh for "gross misbehaviour and conduct", ostensibly because the letter was a breach of protocol. A tribunal set up by Mahathir found Salleh guilty and recommended to the Agong that Salleh be dismissed. Five other judges of the court supported Salleh and were suspended by Mahathir. A newly constituted court dismissed Team B's appeal, allowing Mahathir's faction to continue to use the name UMNO.

Mahathir suffered a heart attack in early 1989, which later inspired the establishment of the National Heart Institute (IJN) to improve cardiac care in Malaysia. Mahathir was praised for opting to undergo the surgery in his own country. He recovered to lead Barisan Nasional to victory in the 1990 election. Mahathir interpreted the election results as a reflection of the people's desire for a strong government. Semangat 46 failed to make any headway outside Razaleigh's home state of Kelantan. Following his electoral victory, Mahathir established the Domestic Trade and Consumer Affairs Ministry to better address issues related to trade and consumer protection.

During the same period, Mahathir led the government in negotiations with Chin Peng and the Communist Party of Malaya (CPM). These efforts culminated in a tripartite peace agreement in Hat Yai between Malaysia, Thailand, and the CPM. According to insiders, the Hat Yai peace accords were initiated by Mahathir. The negotiations, overseen by Special Branch chief Abdul Rahim Mohd Noor, were later documented in Colin Abraham's The Finest Hours, which included a foreword written by Mahathir himself.

=== Economic development to financial crisis (1990–1998) ===
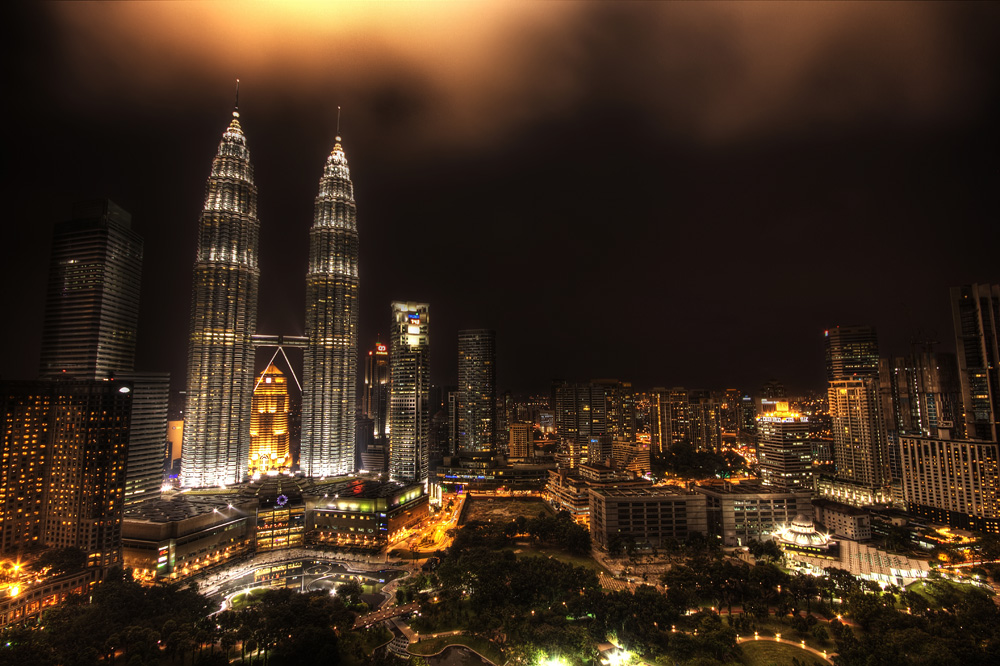
A view of Petronas Towers in Kuala Lumpur, which was built under his tenure.

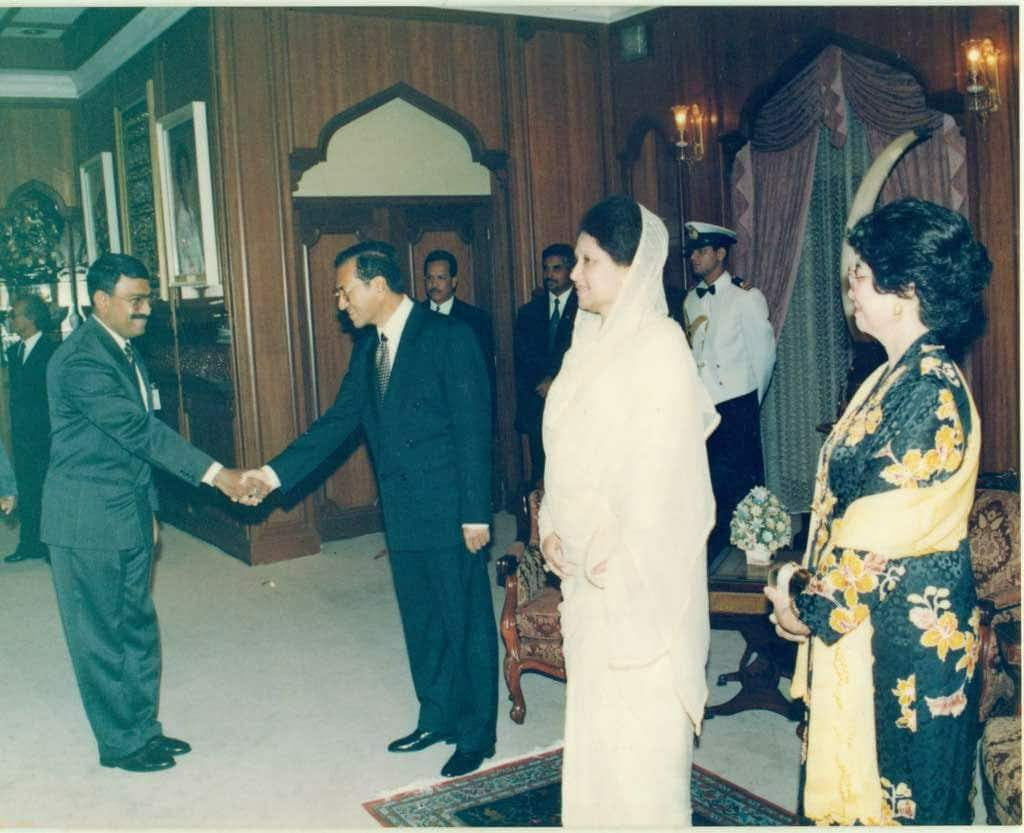
Mahathir meeting Mohammad Mosaddak Ali in 1994.

The expiry of the Malaysian New Economic Policy (NEP) in 1990 allowed Mahathir to outline his economic vision for Malaysia. In 1991, he announced Vision 2020, under which Malaysia would aim to become a fully developed country within 30 years. The target would require average economic growth of approximately seven per cent of gross domestic product per annum. One of Vision 2020's features would be to gradually break down ethnic barriers. Vision 2020 was accompanied by the NEP's replacement, the National Development Policy (NDP), under which some government programmes designed to benefit the bumiputera exclusively were opened up to other ethnicities. Mahathir highlighted that the policy would balance growth with addressing economic imbalances across regions and society.

The NDP achieved one of its main aims — poverty reduction. By 1995, less than nine per cent of Malaysians lived in poverty, and income inequality had narrowed. Mahathir also introduced the Bangsa Malaysia policy, which aimed to facilitate greater representation of non-Malay ethnicities in Malaysia. Additionally, he popularised slogans like Malaysia Boleh (Malaysia Can) in his domestic politics.

Mahathir's government cut corporate taxes and liberalised financial regulations to attract foreign investment. The economy grew by over nine per cent per annum until 1998, prompting other developing countries to emulate Mahathir's policies. Mahathir's bold economic initiatives propelled Malaysia to become the 17th largest trading nation globally. The government rode the economic wave and won the 1995 election with an increased majority. During the election, Mahathir focused his campaign on the frontline states of Kelantan and Penang, promising major development spending and job creation, although Barisan Nasional failed to regain Kelantan, which had been under PAS control since 1990.

Mahathir initiated a series of major infrastructure projects in the 1990s. One of the largest was the Multimedia Super Corridor, a new information technology district south of Kuala Lumpur modelled after Silicon Valley. Microsoft chairman Bill Gates, who was a member of an advisory panel assisting Mahathir in shaping the country's information technology policies, praised the project as "really awesome" during a visit to Malaysia. Other significant initiatives included the development of Putrajaya as the home of Malaysia's public service. He also played a key role in bringing prominent international sporting events to Malaysia, such as the Formula One Grand Prix at Sepang and the Le Tour de Langkawi cycling competition, further enhancing the country's international reputation. Mahathir founded the Space Science Centre (ANGKASA), leading to the establishment of the National Planetarium, which was launched in 1994. He also envisioned Malaysia having its own satellite, a vision realized with the launch of MEASAT-1 in 1995 and MEASAT-2 in October 1996.

Another significant development was the Bakun Dam in Sarawak. The ambitious hydro-electric project was intended to carry electricity across the South China Sea to satisfy electricity demand in peninsular Malaysia. Work on the dam was eventually suspended due to the Asian financial crisis. In 1995, Mahathir visited the Massachusetts Institute of Technology (MIT) and facilitated the establishment of a university modelled after MIT, leading to the founding of the Malaysia University of Science & Technology (MUST). The 1997 Southeast Asian haze, the worst haze event in history caused by Indonesian forest fires, was a major air pollution crisis for the country; Mahathir launched a cross-border firefighting operation in response.

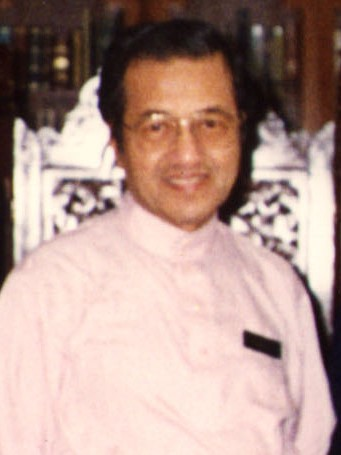
Mahathir at the meeting at the Prime Minister's Office in 1995

In 1997, the Asian financial crisis threatened to devastate Malaysia's economy. The value of the ringgit plummeted due to currency speculation, foreign investment fled, and the main stock exchange index fell by over 75 per cent. At the urging of the International Monetary Fund (IMF), the government cut government spending. It raised interest rates, which only served to exacerbate the economic situation. In 1998, Mahathir defied the IMF's recommendations and implemented bold measures to stabilize the economy. These included pegging the ringgit at RM3.80 to the US dollar, banning offshore trading of the ringgit to curb speculation, and introducing capital controls. Mahathir also launched domestic policies, such as establishing the National Higher Education Fund Corporation (PTPTN) to provide education loans during the crisis. He argued that relying on a floating exchange rate would exacerbate financial speculation and increase the burden of repaying foreign-denominated loans. Concurrently, Mahathir authorized the repatriation of Malaysian assets from abroad.

Malaysia recovered from the crisis faster than its Southeast Asian neighbours, aided by an unorthodox capital control policy. The IMF's 1999 Article IV consultation report acknowledged that Malaysia's capital controls and exchange rate peg, initially met with scepticism, had produced more positive results than expected. The report also recognized that Mahathir's policies had helped stabilize the economy, allowing Malaysia to recover faster than many had anticipated. By 1999, the economy had rebounded with a growth of 5.4 per cent, followed by an 8.5 per cent growth in 2000. Mahathir later recalled that his decision to peg the ringgit to the US dollar in 1998 felt like "putting his head on the chopping block".

In the 1990s, Mahathir found himself at odds with Malaysian royalty over conflicting economic interests. In response to conflicts between Malaysian royals and prospective business leaders, Mahathir's government passed a resolution on royal activities. In the 1992 Gomez Incident, Sultan Iskandar's son, a representative field hockey player, was suspended from competition for five years for assaulting an opponent. Iskandar retaliated by pulling all Johor hockey teams out of national competitions. When a local coach criticised his decision, Iskandar ordered him to his palace and beat him. The federal parliament unanimously censured Iskandar, and Mahathir took the opportunity to remove the constitutional immunity of the sultans from civil and criminal suits. The press backed Mahathir and, in an unprecedented development, started airing allegations of misconduct by members of Malaysia's royal families.

As the press revealed examples of the rulers' extravagant wealth, Mahathir resolved to cut financial support to royal households. With the press and the government pitted against them, the sultans capitulated to the government's proposals. Their powers to deny assent to bills were limited by further constitutional amendments passed in 1994. In 1997, Mahathir officially named the Malaysian flag 'Jalur Gemilang' during the 40th Independence Day celebration.

=== Final years and succession (1998–2003) ===
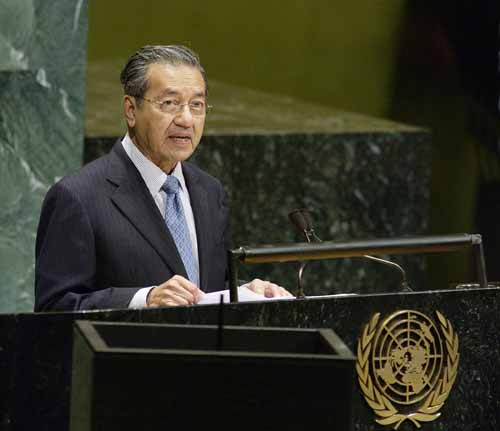
Mahathir addressing the United Nations General Assembly, 25 September 2003

According to biographer Ian Stewart, by the mid-1990s Anwar's leadership ambition was the most serious threat to Mahathir's power. Anwar began to distance himself from Mahathir, overtly promoting his superior religious credentials and suggesting loosening the restrictions on civil liberties. However, Mahathir continued to back Anwar as his successor until the collapse of their relationship during the Asian financial crisis, with Mahathir abandoning the tight monetary and fiscal policies urged by the IMF. As Mahathir took the reins of Malaysia's economic policy over 1998, Anwar was increasingly sidelined. On 2 September, he was dismissed as deputy prime minister and finance minister and promptly expelled from UMNO. No immediate reasons were given for the dismissal. However, the media speculated that it related to lurid allegations of sexual misconduct circulated in a "poison pen letter" at the general assembly. As more allegations surfaced, large public rallies were held in support of Anwar. On 20 September, he was arrested and placed in detention under the Internal Security Act.

Anwar stood trial on four charges of corruption, arising from allegations that Anwar abused his power by ordering police to intimidate persons who had alleged Anwar had sodomised them. He was found guilty in April 1999 and sentenced to six years in prison. In another trial shortly after, Anwar was sentenced to another nine years in prison on a conviction for sodomy. The sodomy conviction was overturned on appeal after Mahathir left office.

Anwar's conviction drew criticism from the international community. US Secretary of State Madeleine Albright defended Anwar as a "highly respectable leader" who was "entitled to due process and a fair trial" and met with Anwar's wife, Wan Azizah Wan Ismail. Wan Azizah had formed a liberal opposition party, the National Justice Party (Keadilan) to contest in the 1999 election. UMNO lost 18 seats and two state governments. By July 2001, Mahathir had reached his 20th year in power but discouraged grand celebrations.

Around the same time, Mahathir established the Women's Affairs Ministry and proposed an amendment to Article 8(2) of the Federal Constitution to include "sex" as a prohibited ground for discrimination, ensuring women's equal rights. He also launched Puteri Umno, urging party members to support and nurture the new women's wing.

In May 2002, Mahathir officially opened the PETRONAS Petroleum Industry Complex (PPIC) in Kerteh, a world-class integrated petroleum hub developed by Petronas that attracted significant foreign investment. During the same time, he also approved Malaysian Chinese Association (MCA) President Ling Liong Sik's proposal to establish Universiti Tunku Abdul Rahman (UTAR). During his tenure, Mahathir proposed sending a Malaysian into space, and on 7 August 2003, he officially announced the astronaut programme. This initiative came to fruition in 2007, when Sheikh Muszaphar Shukor became the first Malaysian astronaut to travel to the International Space Station aboard a Soyuz spacecraft under an arrangement with Russia. Sheikh Muszaphar later regarded Mahathir as the 'father of Malaysia's space programme.'

At UMNO's general assembly in 2002, he announced that he would resign as prime minister, only for supporters to rush to the stage and convince him tearfully to remain. He subsequently fixed his retirement for October 2003, giving him time to ensure an orderly and uncontroversial transition to his anointed successor, Abdullah Badawi. Mahathir simultaneously pledged that he would not take on an elder statesman role after retirement. During his final year in office, Mahathir introduced the teaching of Mathematics and Science in English (PPSMI) in 2003, believing that it is crucial for Malaysians to remain competitive in a fast-changing world. During the Severe Acute Respiratory Syndrome (SARS) outbreak, Mahathir introduced an RM8 billion stimulus package, contributing to Malaysia's 6.5% economic growth in the third quarter of 2003. The package focused on four main strategies and 90 measures to stimulate economic activity, boost consumption, and encourage investment.

On 29 October 2003, the cabinet paid tribute to Mahathir for his invaluable service to the nation as prime minister for the last 22 years. He also received a record-breaking outpouring of public gratitude, marked by a 5.5 km-long banner displaying messages from over 50,000 Malaysians. The following day, Mahathir presented a review of Malaysia's five-year economic plan at Parliament House. Having spent over 22 years in office, Mahathir was the world's longest-serving elected leader when he retired on 31 October 2003.

For his contributions to the development and progress of Malaysia, Mahathir was honoured by his successor, Abdullah Badawi, with the title Bapa Pemodenan Malaysia (Father of Malaysia's Modernisation) after stepping down from office. The following year, Barisan Nasional leaders and members paid tribute to Mahathir during a dinner in Kuala Lumpur, acknowledging his remarkable contributions to the coalition and the nation.

=== Foreign relations ===
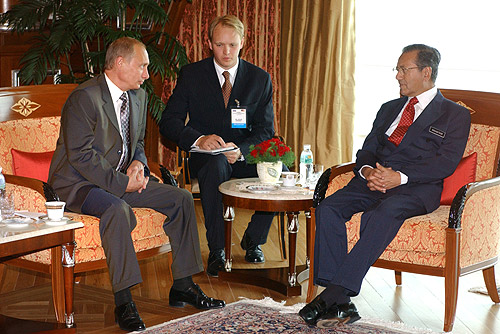
Mahathir with Russian President Vladimir Putin in 2003

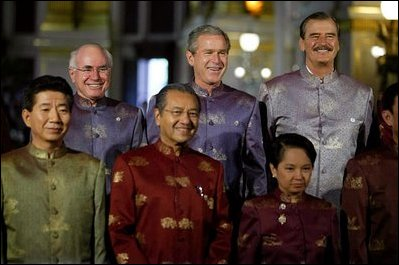
Mahathir stands with APEC leaders for their group photo in Bangkok, Thailand, 21 October 2003

During Mahathir's term, Mahathir maintained a collaborative relationship with the West, despite him being an outspoken critic and prioritised development models and collaboration from elsewhere in Asia. On his first day in office, Mahathir announced that his government would prioritise strengthening ties with neighbouring ASEAN countries, particularly through closer economic cooperation. He chose neighbouring Indonesia for his first official overseas visit. Early during his tenure, a small disagreement with the United Kingdom over university tuition fees led to a boycott of all British goods led by Mahathir, in what became known as the "Buy British Last" campaign. Mahathir successfully negotiated with Indonesian President Suharto to bring the 27-year Ligitan and Sipadan dispute with Indonesia to the International Court of Justice for resolution.

In a shift from his predecessors, Mahathir frequently condemned Israel and ensured Malaysian support for the Palestine Liberation Organization, although he toned down his criticisms after the Oslo Accords were agreed. He has been internationally acclaimed as the voice of the developing world. As prime minister, Mahathir undertook numerous international visits to enhance diplomatic relations, promote trade, and gather insights on foreign nations. In 1987, he was elected as the president of the International Conference on Drug Abuse and Illicit Trafficking.

Mahathir was prominent at the 1992 Earth Summit, arguing against an international forest conservation treaty over what he saw as the undue impact on the development of poorer Global South countries. He had previously threatened to pull Malaysia out of the summit if environmentalists intended to criticise logging in the country. In 2003, Mahathir spoke to the Non-Aligned Movement in Kuala Lumpur, where he blamed Western nations and Israel for a global rise in terrorism. During his final 100 days in office, Mahathir remained focused on offering potent advice to Third World countries on nurturing healthy economies, among other issues.

==== Sovereignty ====
During his tenure as prime minister, Mahathir asserted Malaysia's sovereignty over several features in the Spratly Islands, claiming Swallow Reef in 1983, Ardasier Reef and Mariveles Reef in 1986, and Investigator Shoal and Erica Reef in 1999. His administration cited Malaysia's continental shelf limits and the 1982 UNCLOS as the basis for these claims, while also responding to Vietnam's territorial activities in the region. To strengthen Malaysia's position, Mahathir oversaw the transformation of Swallow Reef into an artificial island with military fortifications, establishing it as a permanent naval outpost. Despite this militarisation, he maintained diplomatic engagement with Beijing, balancing relations with ASEAN claimants and employing a hedging strategy involving China and the United States.

Mahathir's foreign policy towards China on the Spratlys was notably pragmatic. While Malaysia pursued its territorial claims, he emphasised dialogue over confrontation. In 1993, he stated that Malaysia had "no problem with China" regarding the Spratlys, and in 1994, he welcomed China's proposal for joint exploration, opposing further internationalisation of the dispute.

==== Japan ====
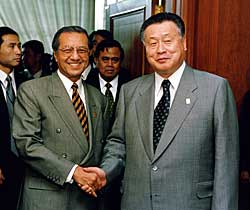
On 25 November 2000, Mahathir shakes hands with Prime Minister of Japan Yoshirō Mori in Singapore

In the early 1960s, Mahathir visited Japan and witnessed its remarkable recovery from the devastation of Hiroshima and Nagasaki, symbolized by the 1964 Tokyo Olympics. Mahathir announced a "Look East" policy in December 1981. Under "Look East", Mahathir particularly prioritised relations with Japan, hoping this would bolster Malaysia's economy and that Japanese work ethic, values and moral norms would have a positive influence on Malaysians. He made over 100 visits to Japan. Consistent with the "Look East" strategy adopted under his leadership, there was a major push for heavy industries by Malaysia in the early 1980s.

==== China and Taiwan ====
Mahathir also strengthened political and economic cooperation with China, whilst maintaining diplomatic ambivalence on security issues to avoid escalating territorial disputes in the South China Sea. He openly criticised China's involvement in Malaysia's communist insurgency, but downplayed any military threat from China after the Cold War ended. In 1985, Mahathir visited China for the first time as prime minister, where he met Chinese leader Deng Xiaoping, establishing a new level of trust that laid the foundation for Malaysia-China relations and set the stage for decades of economic and diplomatic growth. Later, he visited China again in 1993, 1994, 1996, 1999, and twice in 2001.

In the early 1990s, Mahathir played a key role in engaging China with ASEAN despite South China Sea disputes, particularly in the post-Tiananmen and post-Cold War contexts, paving the way for then Chinese Foreign Minister Qian Qichen to attend the ASEAN meeting's opening ceremony in July 1991 as a guest of the Malaysian government, and eventually leading to China's upgrade to ASEAN's dialogue partner in 1996. Amidst the Asian financial crisis, Mahathir also led several large delegations to China and Russia to seek regional economic cooperation.

Besides that, Mahathir also had significant interactions with Taiwan, especially during the 1980s and 1990s, when economic ties between the two sides were at their strongest despite the lack of formal diplomatic relations. During this period, Taiwan was a major investor in Malaysia, ranking among its top five sources of foreign investment, even reaching the top spot in 1990 and 1994. Mahathir himself visited Taiwan in 1984, 1988, and 1997, with two of these visits involving transit diplomacy at Taoyuan Airport. In 1988, he led a delegation of three cabinet ministers on a discreet visit to Taiwan, which drew criticism from Beijing. However, Mahathir defended the trip by emphasizing that Malaysia's engagement with Taiwan was based solely on economic considerations rather than political recognition. His government also facilitated closer ties by allowing Taiwan's trade office in Malaysia to be upgraded and by engaging in high-level exchanges, such as meetings with Taiwanese leaders like Premier Lien Chan in 1993.

==== United States ====
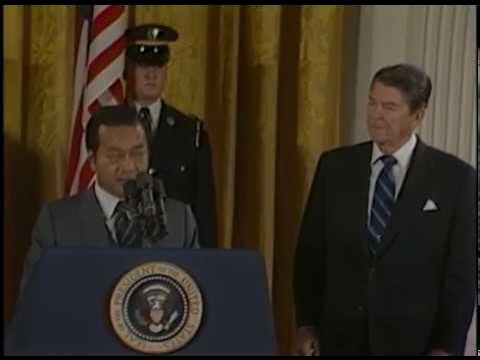
Mahathir and Ronald Reagan in 1984

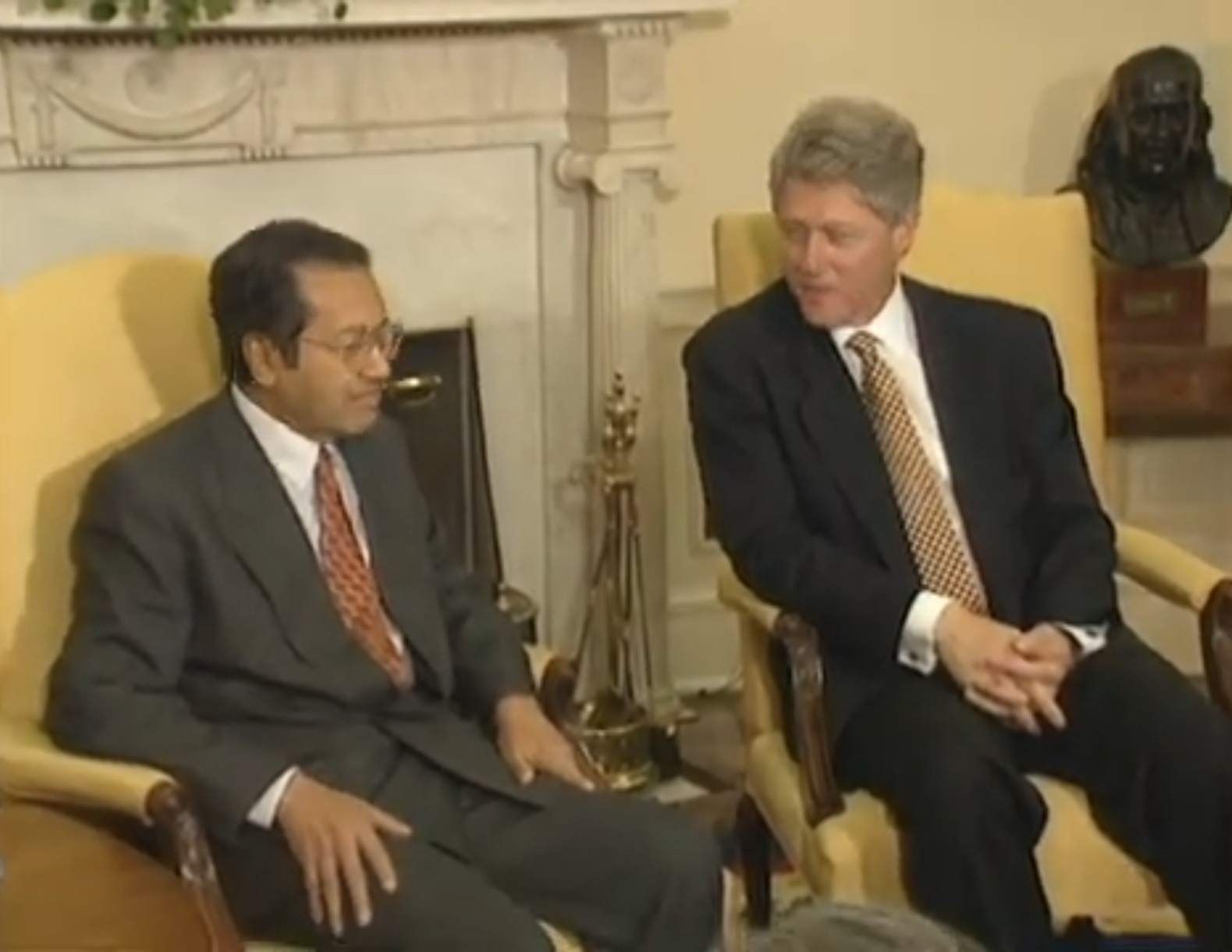
Mahathir and Bill Clinton in 1994

The United States was the biggest foreign investment source and one of Malaysia's closest allies during Mahathir's rule. A 2003 house hearing by the Subcommittee on East Asia and the Pacific of the U.S. House International Relations Committee (now called the House Committee on Foreign Affairs) summarises the relationship between the United States and Malaysia as follows: "Despite sometimes blunt and intemperate public remarks by Prime Minister Mahathir, U.S.-Malaysian cooperation has a solid record in areas as diverse as education, trade, military relations, and counter-terrorism." Mahathir was publicly critical of the foreign policy of the United States, particularly during George W. Bush's presidency. He has also condemned the US-led war on Iraq and Afghanistan.

In 1984, during his first visit to the United States, Mahathir received a warm welcome. He met President Ronald Reagan in the Oval Office, followed by discussions, lunch, and a press conference. He also made a private visit to Tulsa, Oklahoma. Reagan said he and Mahathir "had a valuable exchange of views on international and bilateral issues and found ourselves in agreement to a remarkable degree", but acknowledged differences in Middle East policy. In the years that followed, Mahathir held informal meetings with US presidents George H. W. Bush, Bill Clinton, and George W. Bush at various locations to discuss issues related to palm oil and the United States' attitude towards Muslim countries. In January 1997, Mahathir visited the United States to promote Malaysia's Multimedia Super Corridor. In May 1986, Nancy Reagan became the first First Lady of the United States to visit Malaysia.

In 1998, US vice-president Al Gore gave a speech expressing sympathy for the Reformasi movement at the Asia-Pacific Economic Cooperation (APEC) conference hosted by Malaysia, infuriating Mahathir and other ministers. Analysts interpreted Gore's comments as criticism of Anwar's imprisonment. Anwar, who was the preeminent Malaysian spokesperson for the economic policies and reforms preferred by the IMF, later faced criticism after becoming prime minister in 2022 for implementing many conservative and regressive policies.

Shortly after the 9/11 attacks, U.S. president George W. Bush called Mahathir, describing their discussion as one of the best he had with world leaders and thanking Malaysia for supporting America's anti-terror efforts.

==== United Kingdom ====
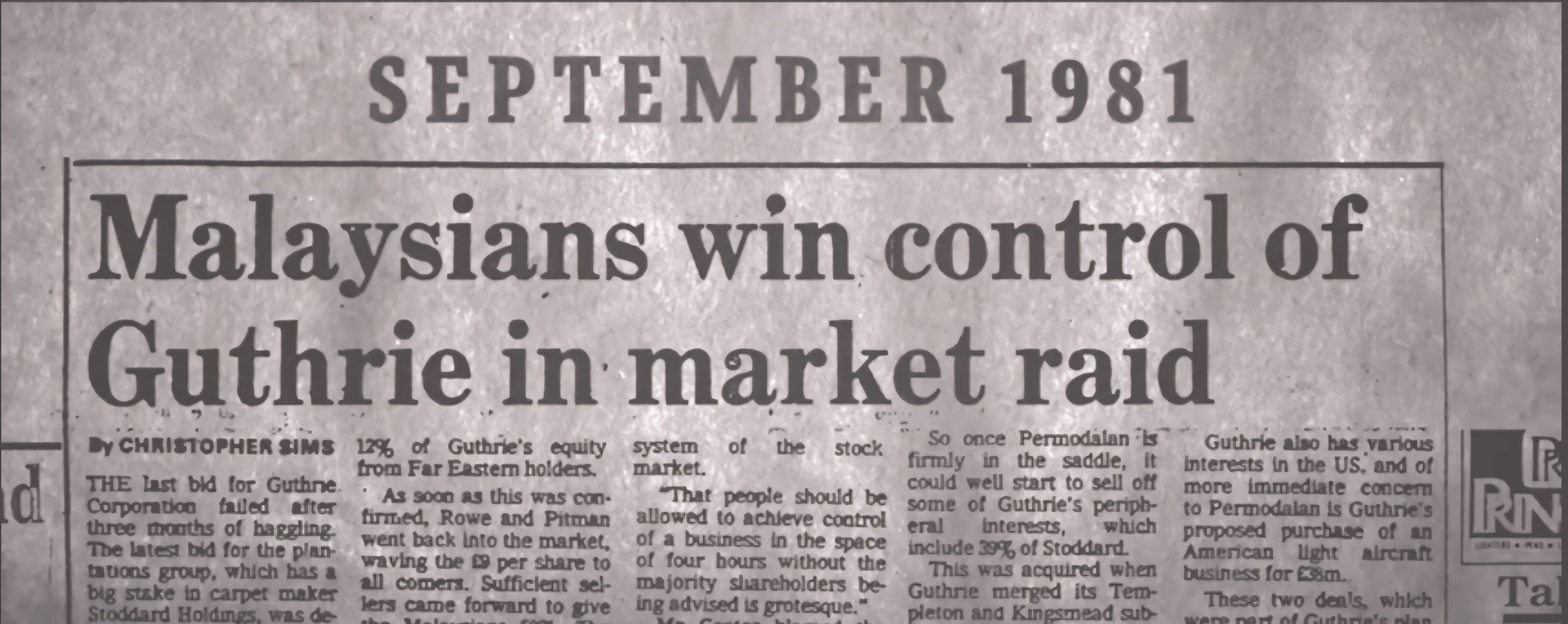
A newspaper headline from September 1981 reporting the successful "Dawn Raid", an initiative under Mahathir that enabled Malaysia to regain control of Guthrie Corporation from British ownership.

In September 1981, shortly after Mahathir assumed office as prime minister, the country carried out the "Dawn Raid", a calculated operation orchestrated by Permodalan Nasional Berhad (PNB) to regain majority ownership of Guthrie, one of the largest British-owned plantation companies at the time. This move symbolized a broader effort under Mahathir's leadership to reduce foreign dominance over Malaysia's economy and reclaim control of national assets.

A month after the Dawn Raid, Mahathir introduced the "Buy British Last" (BBL) policy, which lasted from October 1981 to March 1983. The reason for this policy was rooted in several grievances with Britain. Britain's decision to abolish tuition fee subsidies for Commonwealth students placed a heavy financial burden on Malaysia, which had to cover the increased costs for approximately 17,000 Malaysian students studying in the UK. Additionally, British media criticism of Malaysia's internal policies further strained relations. The BBL policy, which directed government ministries and agencies to deprioritize British goods and services, significantly affected Britain, causing estimated losses of between £15.5 million and £50 million in the early months. This eventually led to negotiations, culminating in Mahathir and British Prime Minister Margaret Thatcher meeting in 1983 to resolve the tensions and end the policy. Mahathir later recalled persuading Thatcher that raising tuition fees was a mistake, leading Thatcher to introduce scholarships for Malaysian students.

Mahathir reclaimed Carcosa Hill, which had been given to the British by Tunku Abdul Rahman after independence as a sign of good faith, and was home to the British High Commissioner's residence. Mahathir developed a close friendship with Thatcher, leading to strengthened bilateral relations between the two countries during their tenure. Thatcher once praised Mahathir as a truly remarkable national leader and described Malaysia as a textbook example of how to build a prosperous nation. After Thatcher's 1985 visit to Malaysia, bilateral ties improved significantly. Key progress included enhanced trade, particularly in palm oil exports and British technology imports, as well as increased educational cooperation through scholarships for Malaysian students in the UK. Malaysia-UK relations were back on track, leading to Malaysia being chosen to host two major world events — the Commonwealth Heads of Government Meeting in Langkawi in 1989 and the Commonwealth Games in 1998. Mahathir spoke of his good working relationship with Thatcher, saying, "Malaysians should remember that she visited Kuala Lumpur three times — no other British PM has done this before or since." During John Major's visit to Malaysia in September 1993, five memorandums of understanding, involving several billion ringgit, were signed between Malaysian and British companies.

==== Australia ====
Mahathir's relationship with Australia and its political leaders was particularly rocky. Although Malaysia-Australia relations were collaborative, Mahathir was publicly critical of the country's colonial history and close relations with the United States. Relations reached a low point in 1993 when Australian prime minister Paul Keating described Mahathir as "recalcitrant" for not attending the APEC summit. The Malaysian government threatened trade sanctions as a response, while the Australian government claimed that Keating's description was a linguistic gaffe, and that what he had in mind was "intransigent".

In November 2002, Mahathir opposed Australia's bid for a seat at the ASEAN summit, emphasizing the need for a thorough study before expanding membership to non-Asian nations. His firm stance, along with Indonesia's reservations, led ASEAN leaders to defer the decision. This marked the third time he had vetoed Australia's efforts to expand its role in the region, having previously played a key role in excluding Australia from the ASEAN Free Trade Area and the regular ASEAN-EU talks.

==== Singapore ====
My warmest congratulations on your appointment as the Prime Minister of Malaysia. Your rise to this high office has sprung from your deep convictions and your constancy of political purpose which have led the people of Malaysia to trust your integrity, fairness and firmness. I feel confident that we can work together to strengthen the traditionally close ties between our two countries. I send you my warmest wishes for your success.

— This congratulatory letter was sent by Lee Kuan Yew on the day Mahathir was sworn in as Prime Minister

Not long after assuming office, Mahathir visited Singapore in December 1981 as part of a delegation to meet with Prime Minister Lee Kuan Yew. Among various bilateral discussions, the two leaders agreed to implement a coordinated time adjustment. This led to the passing of the Malaysian Standard Time Act (1981), initiated by Mahathir. Later, Lee paid a return visit to Malaysia in August 1982. In the early days of his tenure, Mahathir improved relations with Singapore, not only strengthening bilateral ties but also gaining the support of the Malaysian Chinese community.

During his time, Singapore's requests to Malaysia to move its railway immigration checkpoint away from Tanjong Pagar and disputes over water payments were major disagreements between the two countries. The Points of Agreement of 1990 set out the terms for developing land for a Rapid Transit System, although disputes still continued throughout the following decade. Mahathir and Singaporean counterparts also oversaw a dispute over the ownership of Pedra Branca, several islets between the two countries, with an agreed exchange of documents to settle ownership of the islets in 1981 being delayed until at least 1992. The 1997 Asian financial crisis further escalated tensions, with Singapore offering high interest rates for ringgit deposits leading to cash flow issues in Malaysia. However, Lee remarked that he had made more progress resolving bilateral issues with Mahathir between 1981 and 1990 than during the previous 12 years under Mahathir's two predecessors.

On Lee Kuan Yew's death in March 2015, Mahathir wrote an entry on his blog, expressing grief at the news. Although he often disagreed with Lee, Mahathir wrote that he bore him no enmity for the differences of opinion on the direction of Singapore's development, and that ASEAN had lost the strong leadership of both Lee and Suharto of Indonesia, who had died in 2008. Some analysts observed that with Lee's death, Mahathir was the last of the "Old Guard" of Southeast Asia. On the anniversary of Lee's death, Mahathir told the media that Singaporeans must recognise Lee's contributions towards industrialising Singapore. He said that he does not view Lee "as an enemy and all that, but as a Singapore leader who had his own stand that was not the same with the stand of Malaysia".

==== Myanmar ====
In 1997, Mahathir strongly supported Myanmar's inclusion into ASEAN, stating that "we are going to work very hard to get Burma into ASEAN" despite international criticism and American sanctions against the military regime. Mahathir presided as ASEAN chair over Myanmar's admission, playing a key role in ensuring its membership.

However, by 2003, Mahathir's stance toward Myanmar had shifted significantly, particularly following the prolonged detention of pro-democracy leader Aung San Suu Kyi. In an interview, he openly stated that if Myanmar's military government continued to refuse Suu Kyi's release, ASEAN might have to consider expelling the country. This marked the first time an ASEAN leader had raised the possibility of Myanmar's expulsion, drawing considerable international attention.

==== South Africa ====
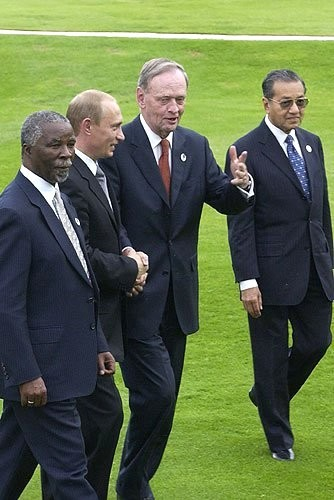
Mahathir was pictured alongside South African President Thabo Mbeki during the 29th G8 summit in 2003. The photograph also features Russian President Vladimir Putin and Canadian Prime Minister Jean Chrétien.

Mahathir and Nelson Mandela shared a close relationship, forged during South Africa's struggle against apartheid. Malaysia played a crucial role in supporting South Africa's transition to democracy, particularly in its preparations for the historic 1994 election that saw Mandela elected as the country's first black president. Mahathir was the first international leader to visit Mandela following his release in 1990. During a meeting held at a Zambian government guest house, Mahathir presented Mandela with a silver keris, a symbol of Malaysia's constitutional monarchy system of government.

Mandela visited Malaysia thrice during Mahathir's tenure as prime minister, first in 1990, second in 1993 and again in 1997. During his third visit, Mahathir hosted a private dinner for the South African president in Langkawi. The close relationship between the two leaders also benefited Malaysian businesses, granting them a "most favoured" status for securing contracts and business opportunities in South Africa. During Mandela's visit, Mahathir further strengthened this partnership with him by jointly launching the Malaysia-South Africa Business Council (MSABC) in Kuala Lumpur. The strong bilateral relations also led to significant progress in political and economic cooperation, with key agreements signed in trade, air services, and shipping. Additionally, Malaysia supported South Africa's development through scholarships for South African students and collaboration in science and technology.

Mahathir visited South Africa three times during his tenure as prime minister: a private visit in April 1994 to congratulate Mandela, an official visit in August 1995, and another in May 1997 when he received the Order of Good Hope.

On 27 August 2013, the Mahathir Global Peace Foundation honoured Mandela with the Mahathir Award for Global Peace. In the same year as Mandela's passing, Mahathir expressed his deep sorrow, calling Mandela a great leader who dedicated his life to social justice. He admired Mandela's magnanimity, noting that despite years of imprisonment, he focused on reconciliation and sharing opportunities between blacks and whites. Mahathir also paid his last respects to Mandela in Pretoria, where he attended as a personal representative of Malaysia.

==== Bosnia and Herzegovina ====
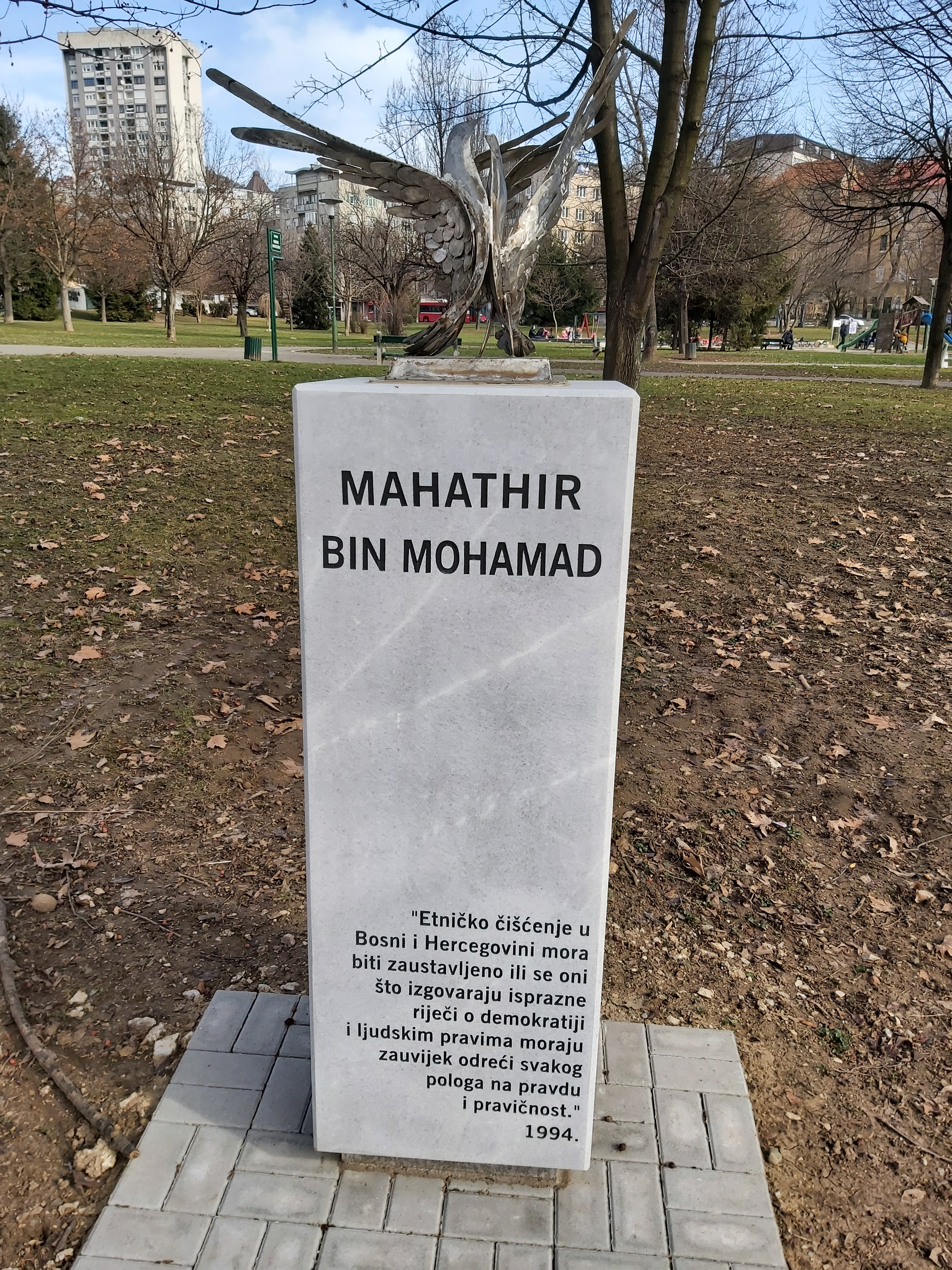
In 2020, a monument dedicated to Mahathir was erected in the Bosnian capital Sarajevo.

Mahathir was a prominent international advocate for Bosniaks in Bosnia and Herzegovina during his tenure. His government permitted Bosnians to come to Malaysia without a visa during the Bosnian War. He was influential in the establishment of an OIC summit in Karachi in 1993 to discuss the need for weapons for Bosnia during the War. Malaysia sent UN Peacekeeping forces to Bosnia and was part of the Contact Group advocating for Bosnia at the UN.

In February 2007, Mahathir was nominated by four non-governmental organisations in Bosnia and Herzegovina for the Nobel Peace Prize that year. The nominations were made by the Serb Civic Council from Bosnia and Herzegovina, the Croat National Council, the Sarajevo School of Science and Technology, and the Congress of Bosnik Intellectuals.

==== Pan-Asia rail link plan ====
Mahathir revived the plan for a "pan-Asian" railway network in 1995, an idea with roots in the early 1900s and later resurfaced in a 1960 UN proposal for a trans-Asian railway spanning 118,000 kilometres. In the Post–Cold War era, as regional development cooperation gained momentum in East Asia, Mahathir proposed the construction of the Trans-Asian Railway linking Singapore, Malaysia, Thailand, and other countries in the central and southern peninsula to China. This was an early example of ASEAN's approach to regional connectivity through infrastructure cooperation. His push led ASEAN to focus on three main routes from Kunming to Bangkok, with extensions south to Kuala Lumpur and Singapore.

In 1996, during a visit to Kazakhstan, Mahathir emphasized the railway's role in connecting Southeast Asia with China and, eventually, Central Asia, granting landlocked nations access to the sea. His comments also foreshadowed China's Belt and Road Initiative (BRI), highlighting Kazakhstan's strategic position between China, Russia, and Europe.

==== Antarctica ====
In 1982, Mahathir discussed the governance of Antarctica at the United Nations Convention on the Law of the Sea (UNCLOS). He emphasized that Antarctica should be regarded as the common heritage of mankind, opposing any unilateral claims of sovereignty and advocating for international cooperation in its management and resource utilization. At the time, there were concerns that minerals could be exploited in Antarctica, and the media regarded Mahathir's stance as the only political challenge ever mounted to the Antarctic Treaty in decades. In 1984, Mahathir stated that while the Antarctic Treaty system had contributed positively, there was a need to establish a broader foundation for international cooperation in Antarctica, and he proposed the formation of a "special committee on Antarctica" to conduct an in-depth study and build consensus on a new administrative framework for the continent and the mechanisms required to achieve it. Later, in October 1999, Malaysia sent four scientists to Antarctica to conduct research, focusing on air pollution as part of Universiti Malaya's air pollution research unit. Then, in November 2001, Malaysia launched a second mission, sending two scientists from Universiti Malaya to conduct research on marine and biological sciences.

In February 2002, Mahathir led a Malaysian delegation, including his wife, Siti Hasmah Mohamad Ali, and several cabinet members, on a visit to Antarctica. They travelled from Ushuaia, Argentina, aboard the Russian icebreaker Kapitan Dranitsyn. Mahathir described the trip as a "once in a lifetime" experience and expressed his amazement at the continent's cold yet beautiful landscape.

== Retirement and post-first term premiership (2003–2015) ==
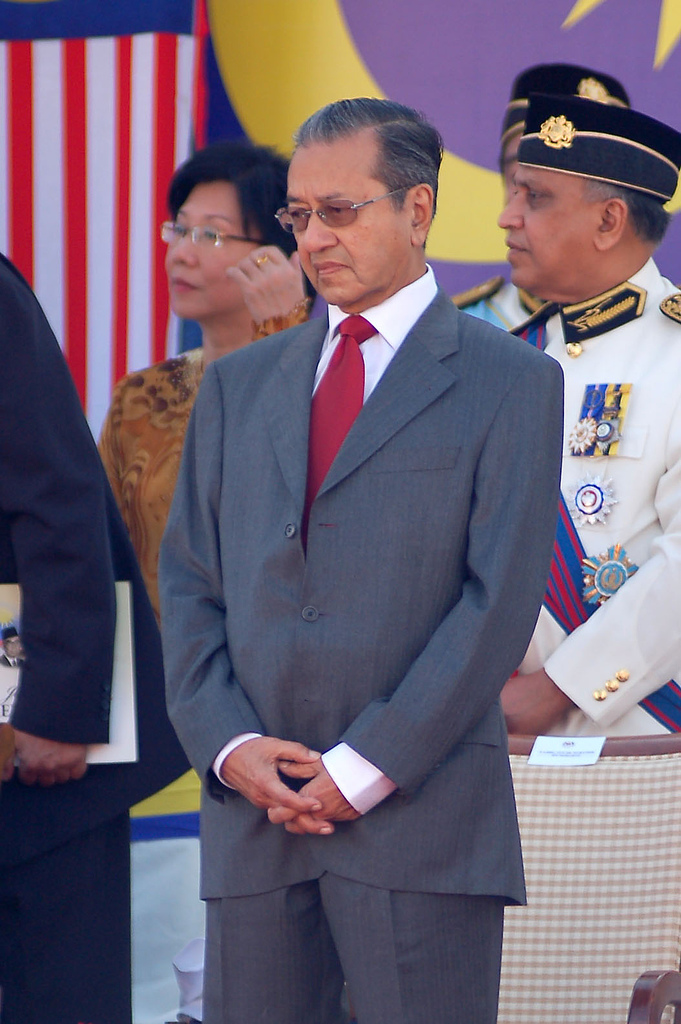
Mahathir at National Day celebrations in August 2007

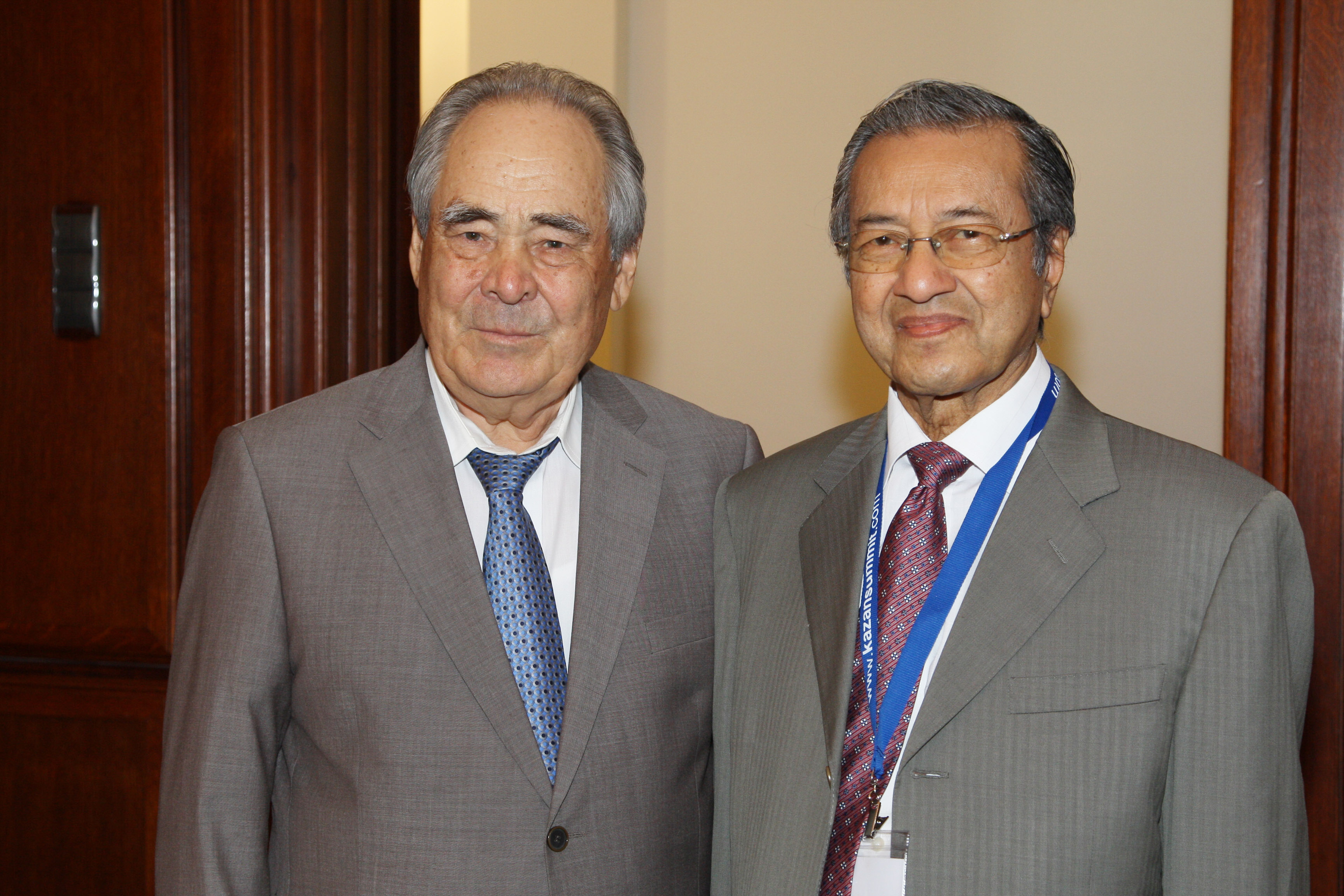
Mahathir with the former President of the Republic of Tatarstan, Mintimer Shaimiev in June 2010

On his retirement, Mahathir was named a Grand Commander of the Order of the Defender of the Realm, the highest honour in Malaysia, allowing him to adopt the title of "Tun". Under Mahathir's leadership, Malaysia was transformed into an industrialising nation. He pledged to leave politics "completely", rejecting an emeritus role in Abdullah's cabinet. Abdullah immediately made his mark as a quieter and less adversarial premier. With stronger religious credentials than Mahathir, he beat back PAS's surge in the 1999 election and lead the Barisan Nasional in the 2004 election to its biggest win ever, taking 199 of 219 parliamentary seats. On 23 October, Mingguan Malaysia, a Sunday edition of Utusan Malaysia, published an exclusive interview with Mahathir, marking his first since retiring as prime minister.

After retiring, Mahathir maintained a busy schedule, engaging in various activities and speaking engagements both locally and internationally. In 2005, Russian president Vladimir Putin visited him at his private residence, where they held a four-hour meeting discussing Malaysia's economic transformation and development strategies. He emphasized the importance of staying active, stating, "Never retire. You have to work. When you work, it will keep you alive." His office at the Perdana Leadership Foundation and residence at the Mines Resort City, as well as expenses for meal allowances, escorts, bodyguards, a medical officer, and a special assistant during overseas trips, are funded by the government under the Member of Parliament (Remuneration) Act 1980 (Act 237).

Mahathir was the CEO and chairman, and hence a senior adviser, for many flagship Malaysian companies such as Proton, Perdana Leadership Foundation and Malaysia's government-owned oil and gas company Petronas. He did not receive any remuneration for his advisory positions. He was also made Universiti Teknologi Petronas (UTP) Chancellor in 2004, succeeding Raja Mohar Raja Badiozaman. On 15 June of the same year, Mahathir was appointed chairman of the NAM Business Council International Advisory Panel. In 2006, Mahathir co-founded The Loaf bakery with Motoko Resources Sdn Bhd, opening its first store in Telaga Harbour, Langkawi, before expanding to 12 outlets in locations such as KLCC, Pavilion, Sogo, and Empire Shopping Gallery. He also served as The Loaf's chairman.

Despite his business ventures, Mahathir remained an influential figure, and his views on national matters continued to draw attention. Mahathir and Abdullah had a major fallout over Proton in 2005. While Abdullah was attempting to reform the company and implemented high import tariffs on foreign cars, Mahathir accused Abdullah's government of cronyism in relation to import licences. Proton's chief executive, a Mahathir ally, had been sacked by the company's board. With Abdullah's blessing, Proton then sold one of its prise assets, the motorcycle company MV Agusta, which was bought on Mahathir's advice.

Mahathir criticised the awarding of import permits for foreign cars, which he claimed were causing Proton's domestic sales to suffer, and attacked Abdullah for cancelling the construction of a second causeway between Malaysia and Singapore.

Mahathir complained that his views were not getting sufficient airing by the Malaysian press. In response, he began writing a column for Malaysiakini and starting his own blog. He unsuccessfully sought election from his local party division to be a delegate to UMNO's general assembly in 2006, where he planned to initiate a challenge to Abdullah's leadership. Mahathir had previously missed the UMNO General Assembly twice since 2006 for health reasons. After the 2008 election, in which UMNO lost its two-thirds majority in parliament, Mahathir resigned from the party. When Abdullah was replaced by his deputy Najib Razak in 2009, Mahathir re-joined the party and urged all former members to follow his move. Before the 2013 general election, Mahathir promised to keep the government in check and ensure it fulfilled its manifesto promises, vowing to protest and fight against it if it failed.

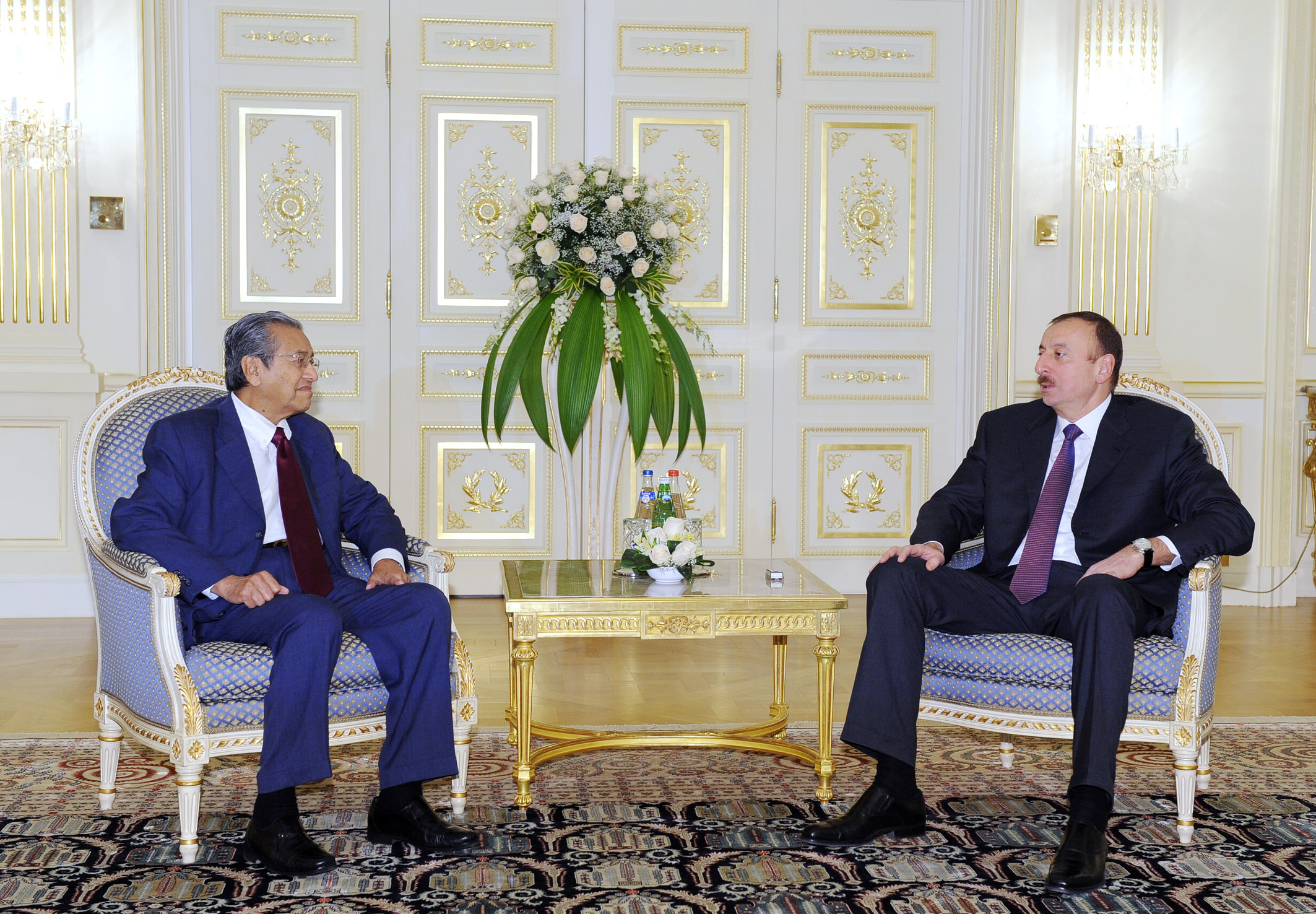
Mahathir met with Azerbaijani President Ilham Aliyev in Baku, 2 March 2012

Mahathir established the Kuala Lumpur Initiative to Criminalise War Forum in an effort to end war globally, as well as the Kuala Lumpur War Crimes Commission to investigate the activities of the United States, Israel and its allies in Iraq, Lebanon and the Palestinian territories. In March 2015, Mahathir attended a conference where he stated his belief in a "New World Order", where an elite would attempt rule the planet in a single world government, and exterminate billions of humans.

== Return to politics (2015–2018) ==
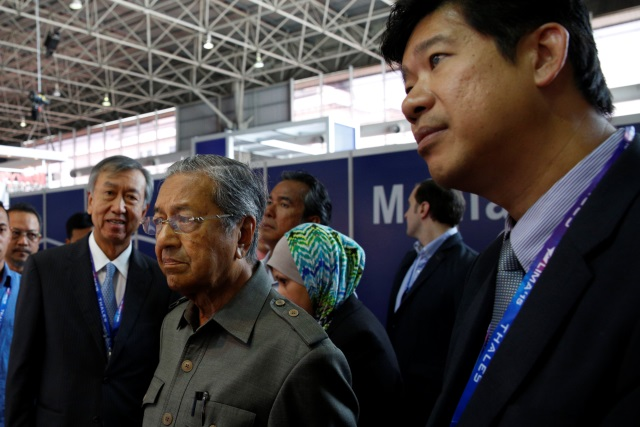
On 18 March 2015, Mahathir and Japanese Ambassador Makio Miyagawa attended the Langkawi International Maritime and Aerospace Exhibition (LIMA'15)

By 2015, even at 90 years old, Mahathir remained sharp and combative. He repeatedly called for prime minister Najib Razak to resign over the 1Malaysia Development Berhad scandal (1MDB). On 30 August 2015, he and Siti Hasmah attended the Bersih 4 rally, a mass protest organised in response to the scandal. In 2016, Mahathir chaired the Malaysian Citizens' Declaration, which brought together several political figures and non-governmental organisations in calling for Najib's resignation. In this declaration, Mahathir listed 37 points. Later, the Citizens' Declaration reached one million signatures in May of the same year. In the 2016 Sungai Besar by-election, he supported Amanah and other Pakatan Harapan leaders, lending his influence to the opposition coalition.

Mahathir left UMNO in 2016, and formed Parti Pribumi Bersatu Malaysia (BERSATU). The new party was officially registered on 9 September 2016, and Mahathir became its chairman. By 2017, he had officially joined the opposition coalition Pakatan Harapan. Negotiations then took place between different factions of the coalition for Mahathir to become the chairman and prime ministerial candidate. He assumed the position of chairman on 14 July 2017, despite reservations from supporters of Anwar Ibrahim, who could not contest in polls himself while imprisoned.

In 2016, Mahathir had his police outriders withdrawn after his privileges were revoked due to his participation in anti-government events. A year later, in 2017, the government further withdrew his personal bodyguard service provided by the police Special Action Unit (UTK), following the earlier termination of his cook and office assistant's contracts. This decision by the government also drew criticism from various parties. However, Inspector-general of Police Mohamad Fuzi Harun denied this, stating that only ordinary police officers had been recalled, while Mahathir's bodyguard service from the elite UTK remained intact. The Prime Minister's Department also refuted this claim, stating that it was still paying for 21 staff at Mahathir's home and office.

In early 2018, Mahathir was announced as Pakatan Harapan's prime ministerial candidate for the upcoming general election. Wan Azizah Wan Ismail, wife of his former political enemy Anwar, ran as his deputy. Mahathir's election promise was to seek a pardon for Anwar, in order to allow him to take over as prime minister after an interim period.

== Second term as prime minister (2018–2020) ==
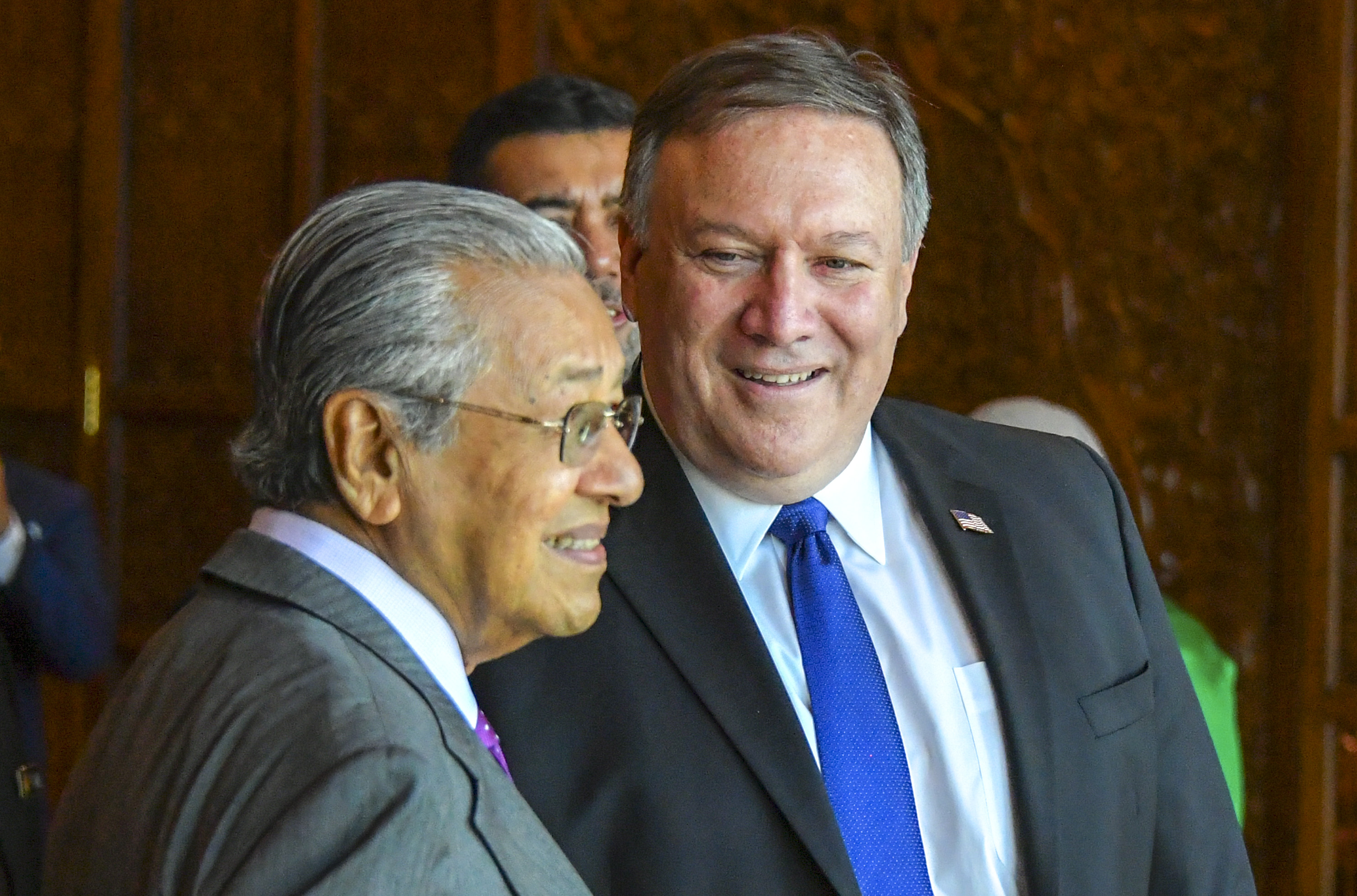
Mahathir meets with US Secretary of State Mike Pompeo in August 2018

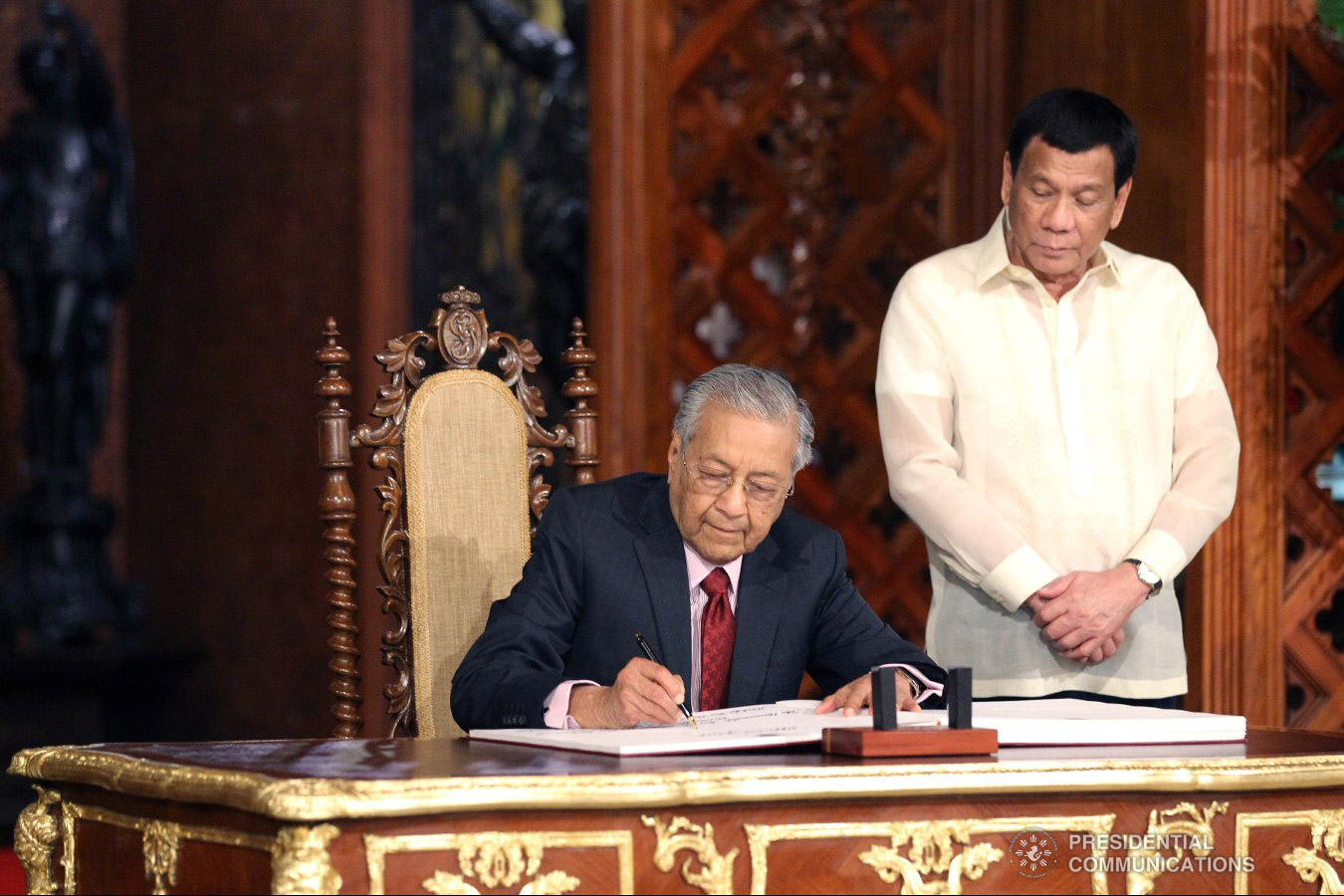
Mahathir and Philippine president Rodrigo Duterte, 7 March 2019

Pakatan Harapan defeated Barisan Nasional in the 2018 general election. Concerns for a smooth power transition emerged as Najib declared that no party had achieved a majority. The National Palace of Malaysia subsequently confirmed Mahathir would be sworn in as Malaysia's seventh prime minister, refuting any claims of delaying the appointment. Immediately after the declaration of the results, people in Kuala Lumpur expressed their joy in celebration of the historic victory. Mahathir announced a two-day public holiday, adding: 'But there will be no holidays for the winners.'

He became the world's oldest serving state leader (aged 92 years, 304 days at the time), and the first Malaysian prime minister not to represent UMNO. Mahathir was also officially recognized by Guinness World Records as the world's oldest serving prime minister. His deputy, Wan Azizah Wan Ismail became the first female deputy prime minister of Malaysia.

In April 2019, Mahathir was listed among Time magazine's 100 most influential people.

=== Domestic affairs ===
Mahathir had promised to "restore the rule of law", and reopen investigations into the 1Malaysia Development Berhad scandal, telling the press that Najib would face consequences if found guilty of corruption. Mahathir instructed the Department of Immigration to bar Najib and his wife, the notoriously extravagant Rosmah Mansor, from leaving the country after they attempted to fly to Indonesia.

Mahathir formed his cabinet of 29 ministers in June 2018. He abolished the unpopular Goods and Services Tax, reducing it from six to zero per cent. Mahathir implemented a "no gifts policy," stating that he would only accept food, flowers, and fruits, while prohibiting government officials from receiving any other gifts to prevent corruption.

He also vowed to cut fiscal spending by firing thousands of civil servants, cancelling an expensive Kuala Lumpur–Singapore high-speed rail link and cutting back on large infrastructure projects initiated under Najib. Malaysia's freedom of the press improved slightly under Mahathir's tenure, and the country's rank rose in the Press Freedom Index. The government announced palm oil cultivation would be limited to 6.55 million hectares by 2023, and began a lobbying campaign to improve palm oil's reputation abroad.

On 20 June 2018, Mahathir met the father of murdered Mongolian woman Altantuya Shaariibuu and agreed that the case of her murder should be reopened.

A year into his term, Mahathir's approval ratings had fallen as the economy slowed and several planned reforms, such as abolishing capital punishment and the Sedition Act 1948, were not realised amid divisions in the coalition. Mahathir announced the Shared Prosperity Vision 2030 in October 2019, which set out for Malaysia to become a high income country by 2030. Another priority of his administration was a more transparent approach to defence. The government prepared the country's first defence policy white paper outlining long-term plans for the country.

=== Foreign relations ===
World map highlighting countries visited by Mahathir during his second premiership. 1 visit 2 visits 4 visits 6 visits Malaysia

Early in his second tenure, Mahathir visited Japan and Indonesia to reaffirm good relations, and reignited a water dispute with Singapore. By the end of 2018, several disputes over maritime and airspace borders with Singapore had continued. Mahathir met twice with president Rodrigo Duterte in his first year in office to strengthen cooperation with the Philippines on a broad range of security, economic and political issues. Mahathir again prioritised relations with Japan and strengthened economic and defence ties with Russia. He visited Vladivostok for a meeting of the Eastern Economic Forum in late 2019, where he cast doubt on the Joint Investigation Team's findings related to the downing of Malaysia Airlines Flight 17. Mahathir called the murder charges brought to four Russians related to the flight "ridiculous", calling it "a political issue on how to accuse Russia of wrongdoing". Malaysia launched a foreign policy framework in late 2019. In response to European Union regulations phasing out palm-oil based biofuels, Mahathir discussed bringing a formal complaint to the World Trade Organization or a case to the European Court of Justice with Indonesian president Joko Widodo.

Mahathir condemned the killing of Saudi journalist Jamal Khashoggi in October 2018 and the assassination of Iranian General Qasem Soleimani by the United States in 2020.

Mahathir was supportive of the 2018–19 Korean peace process. He also indicated that Malaysia would re-open its embassy in North Korea, which had remained closed since the 2017 assassination of Kim Jong-nam.

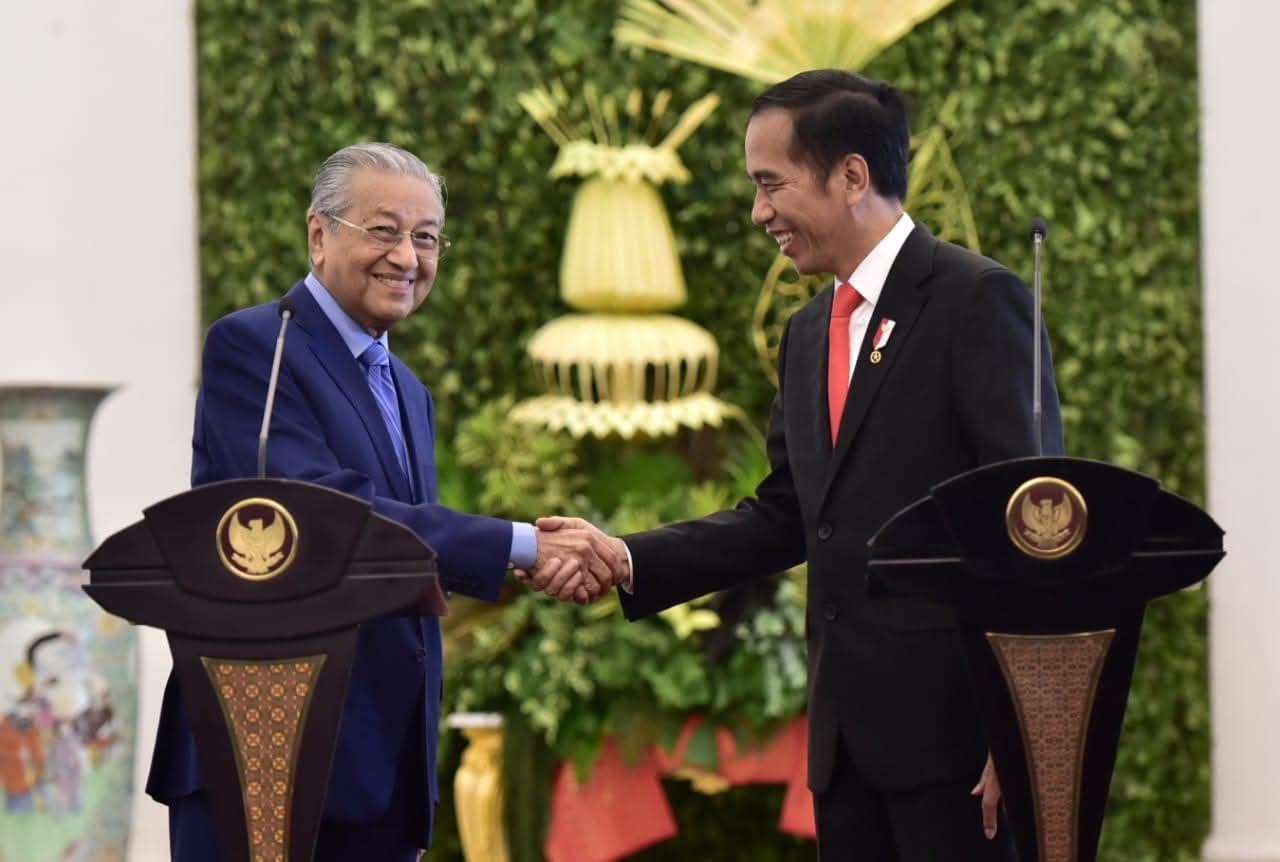
Indonesian President Joko Widodo receiving Mahathir at Bogor Palace, 29 June 2018

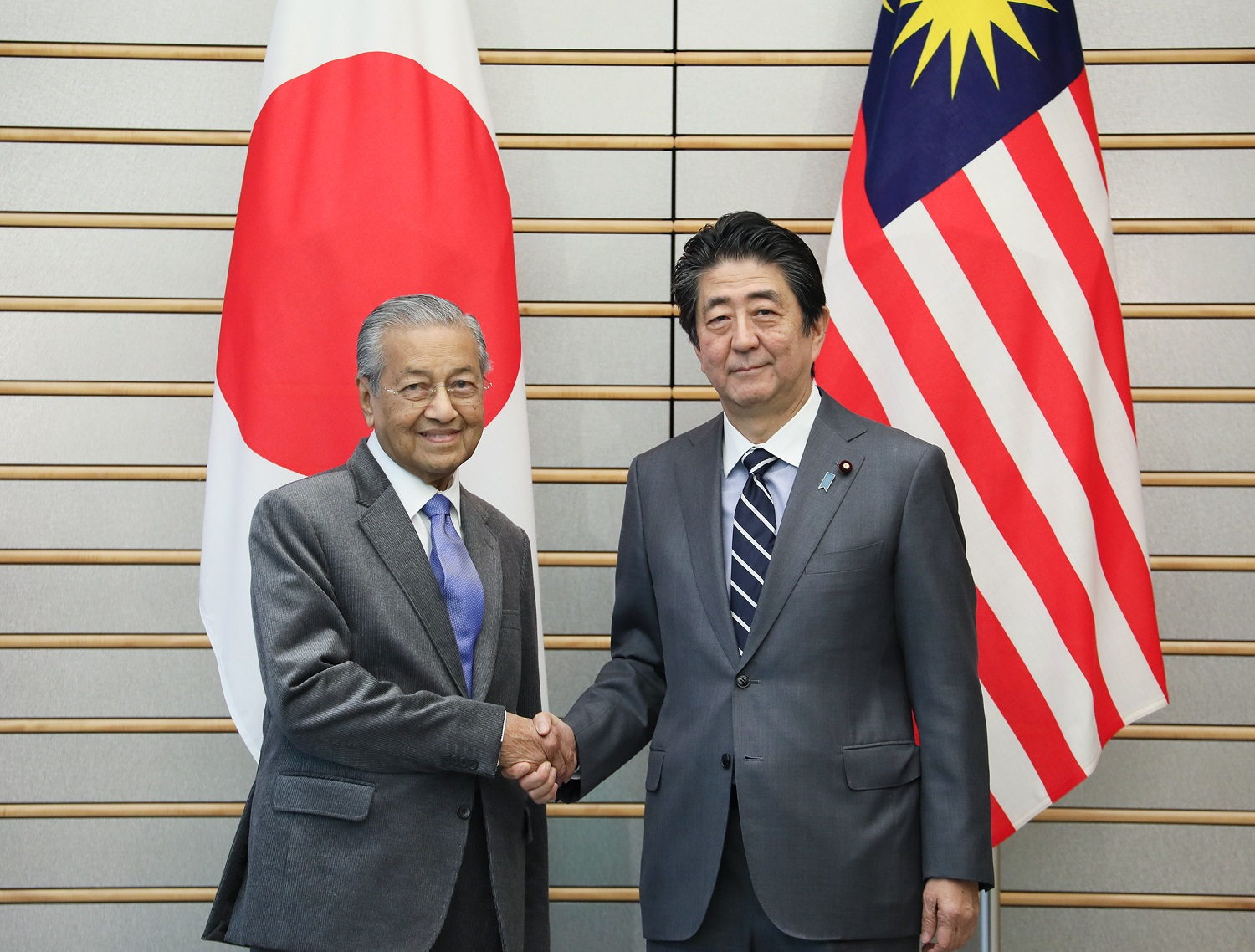
On 31 May 2019, Mahathir held a summit meeting with Japanese Prime Minister Shinzo Abe

==== China ====
Mahathir's administration committed to retaining good relations with China, but promised to review all Belt and Road Initiative projects in Malaysia that were initiated by the previous government. He characterised these as "unequal treaties". His government suspended work on the East Coast Rail Link, which recommenced after terms had been renegotiated. Mahathir cancelled approximately $2.8 billion worth of deals with China Petroleum Pipeline Bureau altogether, citing high repayment costs.

On 13 February 2020, Mahathir spoke with Chinese president Xi Jinping to express solidarity and discuss cooperation in response to the COVID-19 outbreak. Prior to this, Mahathir had expressed his hopes that 2020, the 'Year of Culture and Tourism' between Malaysia and China, would further strengthen the ties and friendship between the two nations.

=== 2020 political crisis and resignation ===
By late 2019, disagreements emerged within Pakatan Harapan about Mahathir's planned handover of power to Anwar Ibrahim, eventually culminating in a political crisis in 2020. Mahathir and a faction of the coalition felt that Anwar would be unable to command a parliamentary majority. MPs supporting Anwar demanded a timeframe for Mahathir's resignation and handover of power.

In February 2020, MPs opposed to Anwar taking over met and agreed to form a new government. Anwar told the media that he had been "betrayed". Anwar and Mahathir met to clarify the situation, where Mahathir insisted he had no involvement in a new government.

Mahathir, refusing to work with UMNO leaders, submitted his resignation to the Agong, Abdullah of Pahang, on 24 February 2020. The Agong appointed him interim prime minister until a replacement could be agreed. BERSATU President Muhyiddin Yassin declared the party's withdrawal from Pakatan Harapan; Mahathir also resigned from the party in response. The next day, Mahathir reported to work as usual in his new role as caretaker prime minister. During his interim premiership, he introduced the 2020 Economic Stimulus Package to counter the economic impact of COVID-19, based on three strategies: mitigating its impact, spurring people-centric economic growth, and promoting quality investments.

On 29 February, the Agong appointed Muhyiddin prime minister, determining that he was most likely to be able to hold the support of a majority in parliament. Mahathir unsuccessfully attempted to challenge this with the Agong, but eventually left the prime minister's office an hour before Muhyiddin was sworn in.

== Post-second term premiership (2020–present) ==
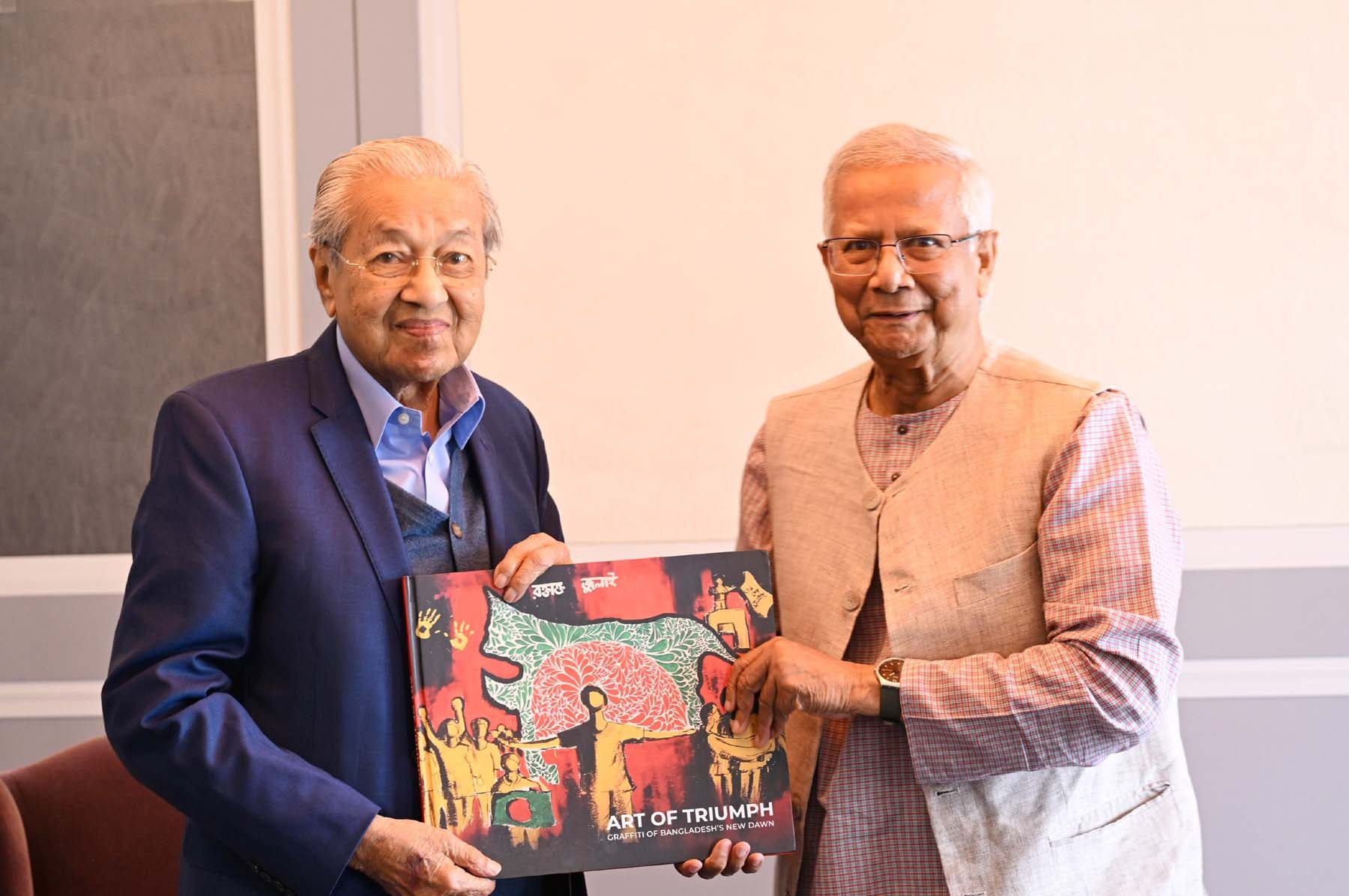
Chief Adviser of the interim Government of Bangladesh, Nobel laureate Muhammad Yunus with Mahathir Mohamad in May 2025.

Despite his advanced age and having stepped down as prime minister, Mahathir remains active on the international stage, frequently travelling, delivering speeches, and continuing to voice his views and influence both domestically and globally. Shortly after Malaysia entered its first movement control order in March 2020, Mahathir underwent self-quarantine at home after having close contact with Bandar Kuching MP Kelvin Yii Lee Wuen, who later tested positive for COVID-19. He formed the Homeland Fighter's Party (PEJUANG) in August 2020. Four other MPs joined the new party, including Mahathir's son Mukhriz. The party was registered in July 2021. In August 2021, Mahathir and other MPs protested in Merdeka Square, calling for Muhyiddin's resignation over the government's response to the COVID-19 pandemic, after being blocked from entering parliament by police.

In April 2022, UMNO president Ahmad Zahid Hamidi filed a defamation lawsuit against Mahathir. In June 2022, Mahathir made irrendentist comments by stating that Singapore and the Riau Islands of Indonesia was once owned by Johor, and argued the state should claim them as part of Malaysia.

In September 2022, Mahathir said he was open to becoming the prime minister for a third time if there were no other suitable candidates. Having previously said he would not defend his Langkawi parliamentary seat, he announced he would contest the 2022 general election. In the election on 19 November, Mahathir lost his seat and election deposit, marking his first defeat in 53 years. No candidate from PEJUANG or Gerakan Tanah Air secured a seat. He later said that his party's plans "had to be dropped" and he would shift his focus to writing about Malaysian history.

In February 2023, Mahathir and 13 other members of PEJUANG (leaving his own son as the sole leader of that party) left the party and joined Parti Bumiputera Perkasa Malaysia (Putra). Later in 2023, Mahathir began promoting a "Malay Proclamation", aimed at uniting Malays. He met with PAS and PN leaders to garner support for the 12-point document listing political, economic and social issues. Mahathir was questioned by police over this campaign under the Malaysian Penal Code, for carrying out "activities that undermine parliamentary democracy". Mahathir also left GTA, criticising the coalition for its poor performance in the election. He supported Perikatan Nasional, the coalition that had ousted him in 2020, in six state elections and was named its "unofficial adviser" for the four state governments under its control.

On 31 August 2024, Mahathir attended the Merdeka Day celebration in Putrajaya in his personal capacity, as he was not officially invited by the government. His presence at the event, where he was warmly received by the crowd, sparked public debate. Prominent academic Chandra Muzaffar criticised the government's decision, describing it as a breach of Malaysian etiquette and values, particularly given Mahathir's status as the country's longest-serving prime minister. He stated that the exclusion contradicted the principles of the Rukun Negara, which emphasised courtesy and morality, and called for a clear explanation from the government.

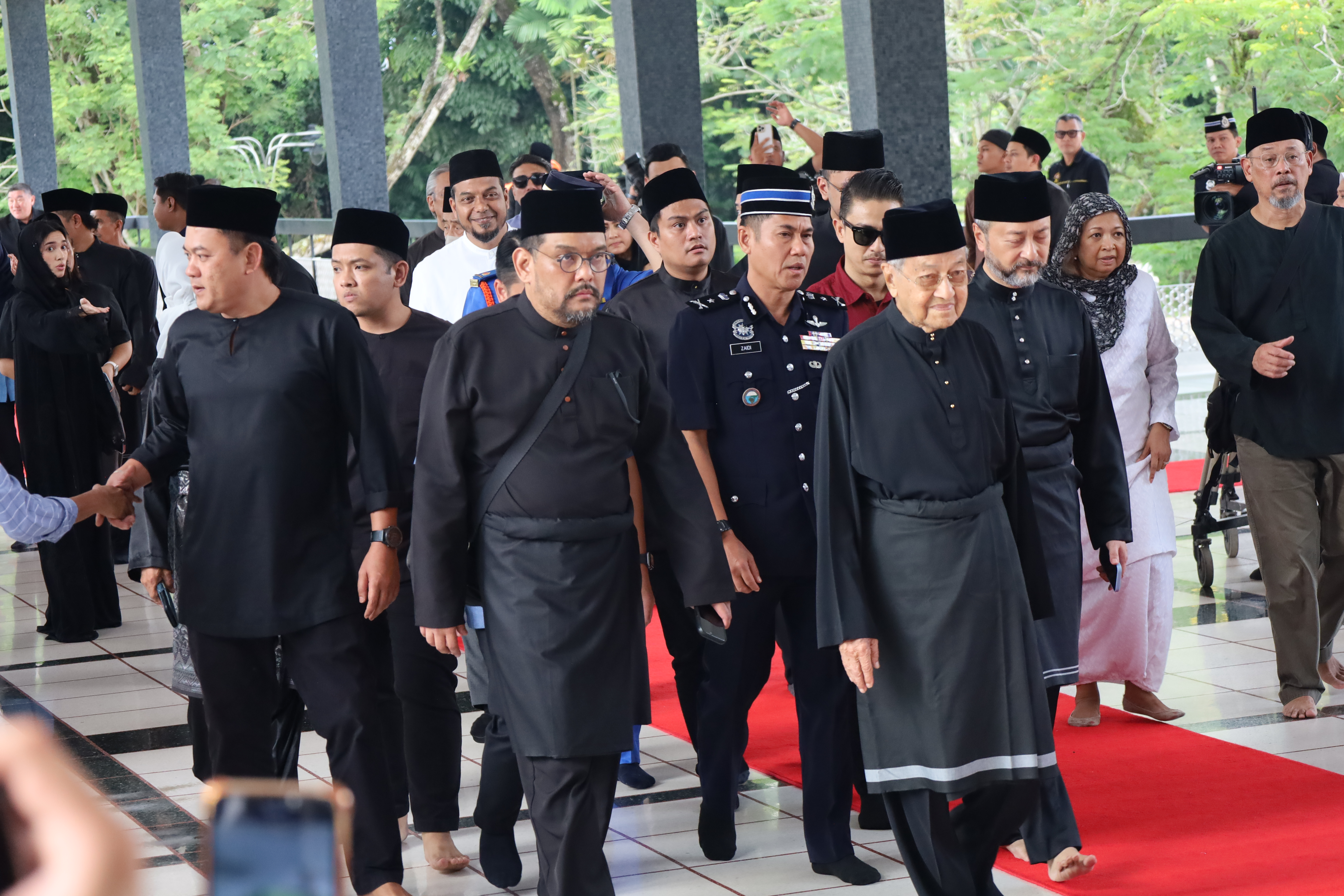
In April 2025, Mahathir, accompanied by his son Mukhriz, his daughter Marina, and a group of others, arrived at the National Mosque to attend the state funeral of his successor, Abdullah Ahmad Badawi

In February 2025, Mahathir's official Facebook account confirmed that his X account (@chedetofficial) had been hacked, resulting in a post promoting cryptocurrency, and efforts were underway to recover it. In April 2025, following the Putra Heights pipeline fire in Subang Jaya, Mahathir visited the Incident Control Post and urged the public not to make premature accusations before the investigation was completed. Shortly thereafter, he also attended the state funeral of former prime minister Abdullah Ahmad Badawi. In an interview in May 2025, he criticised Donald Trump's tariff policies and described him as "living in an old world" over his foreign policy.

On 10 July 2025, Mahathir reached the age of 100, making him one of the few world leaders to become a centenarian. The occasion was widely reported by local and international media, and Prime Minister Anwar Ibrahim, among others, extended birthday wishes. Despite his age, Mahathir remained intellectually active, continuing to write, speak, and share his views through various platforms. Three days later, he was admitted to the National Heart Institute (IJN) for observation due to fatigue, following his participation in a cycling event and a gathering to celebrate his and his wife's birthdays. He was discharged the same day.

On 26 July 2025, Mahathir participated in the Turun Anwar rally at Dataran Merdeka, joining several opposition leaders in calling for Prime Minister Anwar Ibrahim's resignation. Prior to that, at a rally in Alor Setar, he had similarly urged Anwar to step down, citing mismanagement of national wealth and poor governance.

In December 2025, Mahathir lodged a police report accusing Anwar of economic sabotage and undermining Malaysia's sovereignty over the Malaysia–United States Agreement on Reciprocal Trade (ART), an agreement that later sparked public controversy over provisions seen by critics as obliging Malaysia to align with US sanctions, compromise regulatory autonomy, and weaken the country's long-standing policy of non-alignment.

In early January 2026, Mahathir was admitted to the National Heart Institute (IJN) for observation after he fell at his residence and was taken to hospital by ambulance. Hospital officials later confirmed that he had sustained a fracture to his right hip and remained in stable condition while receiving treatment. According to his son, Mukhriz Mahathir, medical specialists advised that he was not suitable for hip replacement surgery due to age-related risks, and that a non-surgical recovery approach would be adopted. Mahathir's hospitalisation attracted significant domestic and international attention, with Turkish President Recep Tayyip Erdoğan conveying his concern and well wishes during a meeting with Prime Minister Anwar Ibrahim while the latter was on an official visit to Turkey. On 29 September, the day after his wife Siti Hasmah died, Mahathir was hospitalized at the National Heart Institute in Kuala Lumpur.

== Political positions and views ==
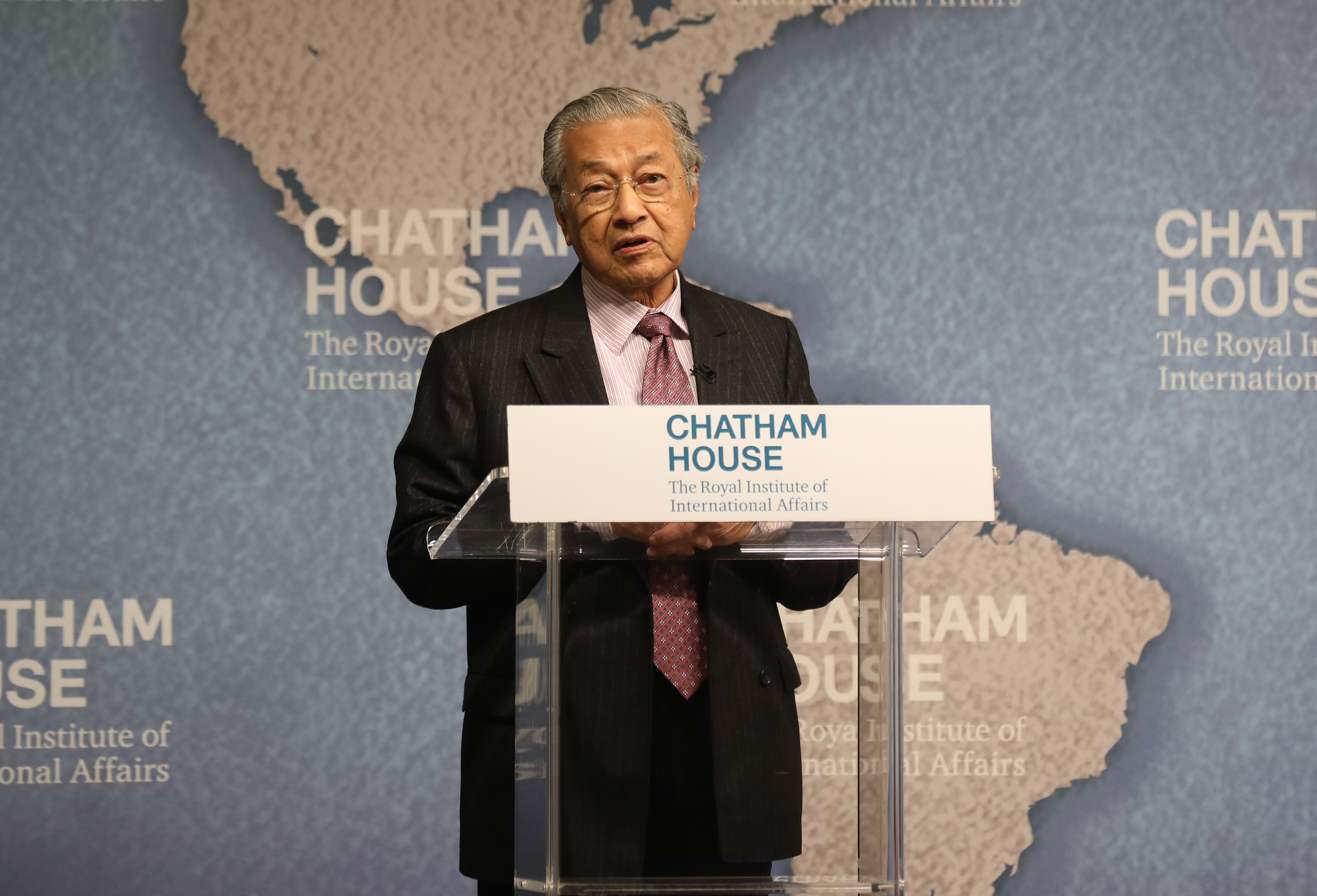
Mahathir speaking about "The Future of Democracy in Asia" in Chatham House, United Kingdom in 2018

Mahathir's political views have shifted during his lengthy career. During the 1980s and 1990s, he was a supporter of third-worldism, while during other periods he has been a proponent of "Asian values" and globalisation. A Muslim thinker, he holds Islamic political views. In 2002, he characterised himself as an Islamic fundamentalist. Mahathir is generally respected in developing and Islamic countries, particularly due to his oversight of Malaysia's economic growth and his support of liberal Muslim values.

Mahathir has been described as a proponent of Malay nationalism. In The Malay Dilemma, he argued that the Malay race had been marginalised, and voiced his support for affirmative action policies for them. Upon his first resignation, he expressed his disappointment at the progress made towards his "principle task" of supporting the Malay race. In 2021, Mahathir said he did not believe in Ketuanan Melayu, calling it a "fantasy", and said instead that he believed in the concept of "Bangsa Malaysia". He has been described as anti-royalist by the left-wing French newspaper Libération, owing to his efforts to oppose immunity for members of Malaysia's monarchies.

Mahathir is a vocal critic of neoliberalism and the Western world. In 2011, Mahathir suggested that the September 11 attacks might have been staged by the United States government. Mahathir condemned the Universal Declaration of Human Rights in 1997, suggesting it be revised to place greater importance on economic growth over civil liberties. In 2019, Mahathir said that Malaysians should learn from the hard work of China's citizens, which enabled their nation to achieve technological advancement within a few decades. In 2025, he said that China would overtake the United States and remain the world's top power in the long term, while downplaying India's potential to compete with China on a global scale.

Mahathir has advocated for a balance between environmental protection and natural resource use for economic growth in developing countries. He referred to the outcomes of the Earth Summit as "eco-imperialism", arguing that Global North countries put an undue burden on Global South countries for environmental degradation. In response to international scrutiny, he said in 2019 that linking palm oil production to deforestation was "baseless, unfair and unjustified" and that the Malaysian palm oil sector had developed sustainably.

In the aftermath of the 2020 Nice stabbing and murder of Samuel Paty, Mahathir posted remarks on his blog. Mahathir said that the attacks were wrong and against Islam, but also argued that Muslims had a right to be angry and kill French people for past massacres committed by the French. Mahathir's post was later circulated on his Twitter account, where it was labelled for "glorifying violence". Mahathir was criticised for stoking tensions and hatred by the former Australian ambassador to France Brendan Berne, Australian prime minister Scott Morrison, and French secretary of state for digital affairs Cédric O. Malaysian cleric and politician Fathul Bari Mat Jahya also condemned Mahathir's remarks. Mahathir responded that his comments were taken out of context and he was not "promoting massacre of the French". Facebook and Twitter later removed his posts.

== Personal life ==
I don't smoke, I don't drink, and I don't overeat. I eat just enough to keep me going. Once people hit a certain age, there's a tendency to become overweight. Many develop a big stomach, and to feel satisfied, they eat and drink too much, which puts a strain on their heart. I've stayed around 62 to 64 kg for years, and I can still wear clothes I had made 30 years ago.

— Mahathir in 2019, reflecting on his longevity.

Mahathir follows a disciplined lifestyle. He attributes his longevity and health to self-discipline, a controlled diet, regular reading to keep his mind active, and avoiding overeating, which he believes leads to obesity and related diseases. He has consistently maintained his weight at 62 kg for many years. His hobbies include sailing, horse riding, and carpentry, and he has built a functioning steam train and a boat. An avid reader, his favourite authors are Wilbur Smith and Jeffrey Archer.

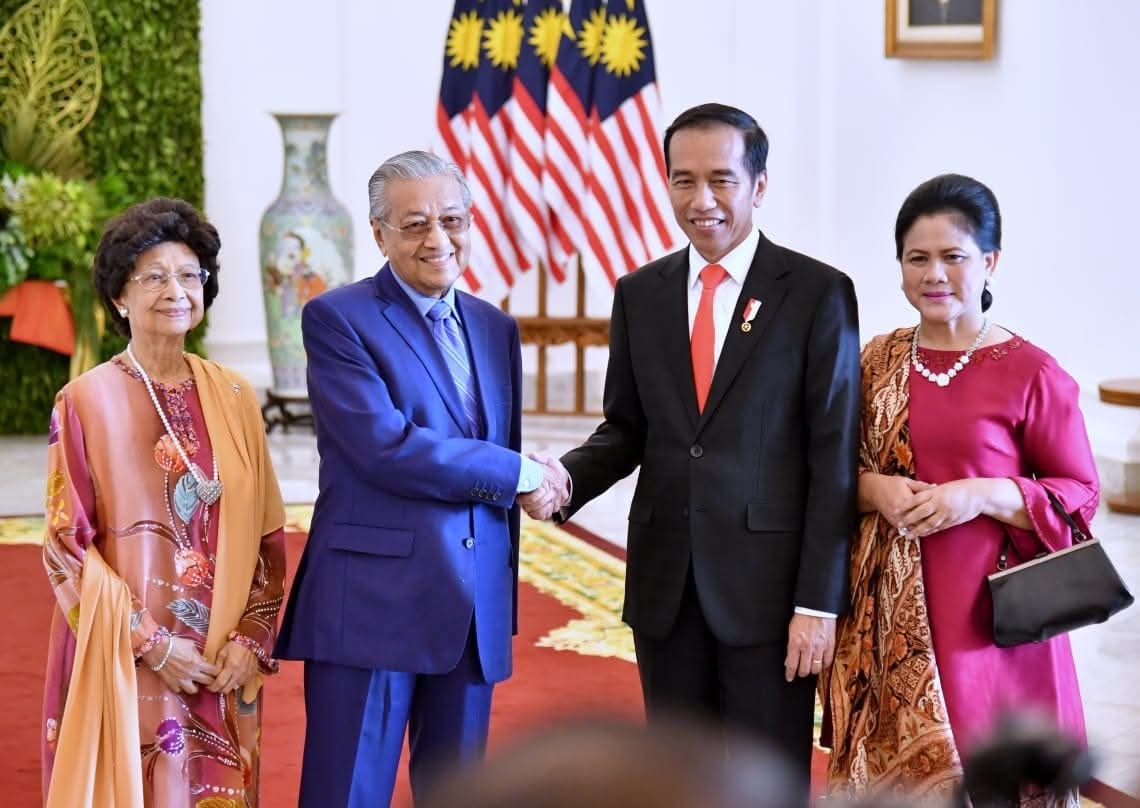
Mahathir and Siti Hasmah with Indonesian President Joko Widodo and his wife Iriana, 29 June 2018

Mahathir met his wife, Siti Hasmah, during their medical studies, and they married in 1956. They had four biological children—Marina, Mirzan, Mokhzani, and Mukhriz—and later adopted three more—Melinda, Maizura, and Mazhar. In 2021, they celebrated their 65th wedding anniversary. His granddaughter, Ineza, has described him as a family-oriented man who enjoys spending time with his grandchildren. Siti Hasmah died on 28 September 2026, aged 100.

Mahathir is widely known for his workaholic nature. Despite his demanding schedule, he enjoys simple pleasures such as cooking and driving his family to restaurants. He is also a fan of the song "My Way" and owns a stable of horses, most of which were gifted to him. His childhood home in Alor Setar, named Rumah Kelahiran Mahathir Mohamad, was restored and opened to the public in 1992, showcasing personal memorabilia from his early life.

Despite his longevity, Mahathir had experienced a range of health problems over the decades, some of them serious. These included heart conditions and chest infections that led to repeated hospitalisations and several surgical procedures, including two coronary artery bypass operations. He had also been a target of security threats during his political career and especially during his premiership, though none have caused him serious harm.

Mahathir neither drinks alcohol nor smokes. On 10 July 2025, he celebrated his 100th birthday by making a special live podcast at his office in Putrajaya. He described his centennial as being a "normal day". The occasion was marked by widespread public attention and official greetings, including from Prime Minister Anwar Ibrahim and other members of his unity government. Former Singapore Prime Minister Lee Hsien Loong also extended his birthday wishes to Mahathir.

== Cultural depictions ==
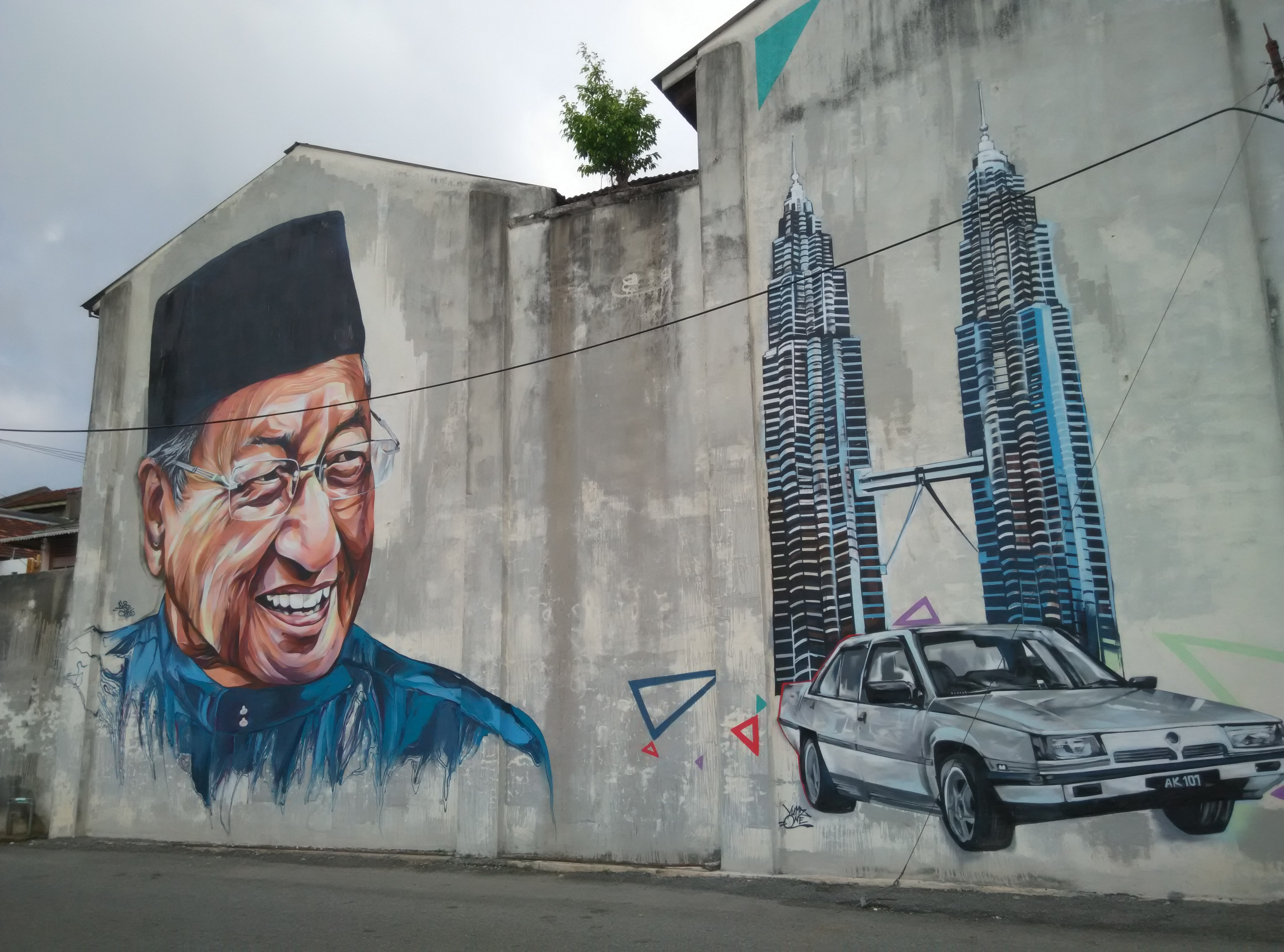
In 2015, a 30.48-metre-wide mural of Mahathir was painted in Jalan Pekan Melayu, Alor Setar, featuring him alongside the Petronas Twin Towers and Proton Saga, symbolising his legacy as Malaysia's 'Father of Modernisation'.

Mahathir has been depicted in various cultural forms, reflecting his role in Malaysian history. In 2010, the musical Mahathir, the Musical portrayed his life from his early years to his political career, with Esma Daniel in the lead role. The production was well received and had an extended run. A sequel followed in 2011. In 2012, the play Teater Tun Siti Hasmah focused on his wife, Siti Hasmah, highlighting her career as a doctor and first lady, with Nazim Othman and Esma Daniel portraying Mahathir. A mural of Mahathir was unveiled in Alor Setar, Kedah in 2015. Internationally, a monument dedicated to Mahathir was inaugurated in Sarajevo, Bosnia and Herzegovina in December 2020, created by artist Enes Sivac. The monument includes an excerpt from Mahathir's speech at the International Conference of Parliamentarians on Bosnia-Herzegovina.

== Election results ==
Parliament of Malaysia
Year	Constituency	Candidate	Votes	Pct	Opponent(s)	Votes	Pct	Ballots cast	Majority	Turnout
1964	P008 Kota Star Selatan	Mahathir Mohamad (UMNO)	12,406	60.22%	Ahmad Shukri Abdul Shukur (PAS)	8,196	39.78%	21,440	4,210	82.8%
1969	P008 Kota Star Selatan	Mahathir Mohamad (UMNO)	12,032	48.03%	Yusof Rawa (PAS)	13,021	51.97%	25,679	989	78.6%
1974	P004 Kubang Pasu	Mahathir Mohamad (UMNO)	Unopposed							
1978	P004 Kubang Pasu	Mahathir Mohamad (UMNO)	18,198	64.64%	Halim Arshat (PAS)	9,953	35.36%	29,014	8,245	78.36%
1982	P004 Kubang Pasu	Mahathir Mohamad (UMNO)	24,524	73.67%	Yusof Rawa (PAS)	8,763	26.33%	34,340	15,761	78.79%
1986	P004 Kubang Pasu	Mahathir Mohamad (UMNO)	25,452	71.48%	Azizan Ismail (PAS)	10,154	28.52%	36,409	15,298	74.21%
1990	P004 Kubang Pasu	Mahathir Mohamad (UMNO)	30,681	78.07%	Sudin Wahab (S46)	8,619	21.93%	40,570	22,062	77.51%
1995	P006 Kubang Pasu	Mahathir Mohamad (UMNO)	24,495	77.12%	Ahmad Mohd Alim (PAS)	7,269	22.88%	33,010	17,226	73.61%
1999	P006 Kubang Pasu	Mahathir Mohamad (UMNO)	22,399	63.22%	Ahmad Subki Abd. Latif (PAS)	12,261	34.61%	36,106	10,138	78.62%
2018	P004 Langkawi	Mahathir Mohamad (BERSATU)	18,954	54.90%	Nawawi Ahmad (UMNO)	10,061	29.14%	35,250	8,893	80.87%
2018	P004 Langkawi	Mahathir Mohamad (BERSATU)	18,954	54.90%	Zubir Ahmad (PAS)	5,512	15.96%	35,250	8,893	80.87%
2022	P004 Langkawi	Mahathir Mohamad (PEJUANG)	4,566	9.62%	Mohd Suhaimi Abdullah (BERSATU)	25,463	53.63%	48,123	13,518	71.10%
2022	P004 Langkawi	Mahathir Mohamad (PEJUANG)	4,566	9.62%	Armishah Siradj (UMNO)	11,945	25.16%	48,123	13,518	71.10%
2022	P004 Langkawi	Mahathir Mohamad (PEJUANG)	4,566	9.62%	Zabidi Yahya (AMANAH)	5,417	11.41%	48,123	13,518	71.10%
2022	P004 Langkawi	Mahathir Mohamad (PEJUANG)	4,566	9.62%	Abd Kadir Sainudin (IND)	89	0.19%	48,123	13,518	71.10%

== Honours, awards and recognitions ==
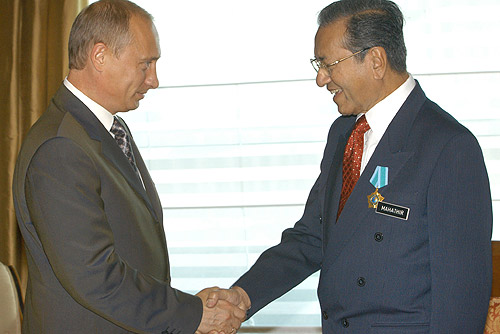
In August 2003, Russian President Vladimir Putin awarded Mahathir the Russian Order of Friendship

Mahathir received numerous awards and recognitions, including the Royal Family Order of Brunei (1997), Order of Mubarak the Great (1997), Honorary Ph.D. in Humanities from the National University of Mongolia (1997), Honorary Ph.D. in literature from Al-Azhar University (1998), U Thant Peace Award from the United Nations Organization (1999), Order of Merit of the Republic of Poland (2002), Russian Order of Friendship (2003), Honorary Ph.D. from Tsinghua University (2004), Honorary Ph.D. from the University of Santo Tomas (2012), Honorary Ph.D. in Laws from the National University of Singapore (2018), Japanese Order of the Paulownia Flowers (2018), Honorary Ph.D. from Qatar University (2019), Honorary Ph.D. from the International University of Japan (2019), Nishan-e-Pakistan (2019), and the Order of the Republic of Turkey (2019).

== Books ==
- The Malay Dilemma (1970) ISBN 981-204-355-1
- The Challenge (1986) ISBN 967-978-091-0
- Regionalism, Globalism, and Spheres of Influence: ASEAN and the Challenge of Change into the 21st century (1989) ISBN 981-303-549-8
- Mahathir, Great Malaysian Hero (1990) ISBN 983-9683-00-4
- The Asia That Can Say No (Note: Japanese:「NO」と言えるアジア) (Note: In collaboration with Shintaro Ishihara) (1994) ISBN 433-405-217-7
- The Pacific Rim in the 21st century (1995)
- The Challenges of Turmoil (1998) ISBN 967-978-652-8
- The Way Forward (1998) ISBN 0-297-84229-3
- A New Deal for Asia (1999)
- Islam & The Muslim Ummah (2001) ISBN 967-978-738-9
- Globalisation and the New Realities (2002)
- Reflections on Asia (2002) ISBN 967-978-813-X
- The Malaysian Currency Crisis: How and why it Happened (2003) ISBN 967-978-756-7
- Mahathir: 22 Years, 22 Voices (2003)
- Dr Mahathir Mohamad - Father of Sports Development (2003)
- Achieving True Globalisation (2004) ISBN 967-978-904-7
- Islam, Knowledge, and Other Affairs (2006) ISBN 983-3698-03-4
- Principles of Public Administration: An Introduction (2007) ISBN 978-983-195-253-5
- Chedet.com Blog Merentasi Halangan (Bilingual) (2008) ISBN 967-969-589-1
- A Doctor in the House: The Memoirs of Tun Dr Mahathir Mohamad (2011) ISBN 9789675997228
- Doktor Umum: Memoir Tun Dr. Mahathir Mohamad (Note: This book was the BM version of his best-selling memoir, A Doctor in the House: The Memoirs of Tun Dr Mahathir Mohamad.) (2012) ISBN 9789674150259
- Blogging to Unblock (Book 2): A Citizen's Rights (2013) ISBN 9789679696288
- Dr. M: Apa Habaq Orang Muda? (2016) ISBN 9789671367995
- Capturing Hope: The Struggle Continues for a New Malaysia (2021) ISBN 9789672923183
- A Conversation with Tun Dr Mahathir bin Mohamad: A Legacy of Leadership and Vision (2025) ISBN 9789670821436

== See also ==
- Mahathir, the Musical
- Mahathir Science Award
- History of Malaysia
- List of oldest living state leaders

== Notes ==
Political offices
Preceded by Mohamed Yaacob	Federal Minister of Education; 1974–1977	Succeeded by Musa Hitam
Preceded by Hamzah Abu Samah	Federal Minister of International Trade and Industry; 1978–1981	Succeeded by Abdullah Ahmad Badawi
Preceded by Hussein Onn	Deputy Prime Minister of Malaysia; 1978–1981	Succeeded by Musa Hitam
Preceded by Hussein Onn	Prime Minister of Malaysia; 1981–2003	Succeeded by Abdullah Ahmad Badawi
Preceded by Abdul Taib Mahmud	Federal Minister of Defence; 1981–1986	Succeeded by Abdullah Ahmad Badawi
Preceded by Musa Hitam	Federal Minister of Home Affairs; 1986–1999	Succeeded by Abdullah Ahmad Badawi
Preceded by Anwar Ibrahim	Federal Minister of Finance; 1998–1999	Succeeded by Daim Zainuddin
Preceded by Daim Zainuddin	Federal Minister of Finance; 2001–2003	Succeeded by Abdullah Ahmad Badawi
Preceded by Najib Razak	Prime Minister of Malaysia; 2018–2020	Succeeded by Muhyiddin Yassin
Diplomatic posts
Preceded by Jean Chrétien	Chair of the Asia-Pacific Economic Cooperation; 1998	Succeeded by Jenny Shipley
Preceded by Thabo Mbeki	Secretary General of the Non-Aligned Movement; 2003	Succeeded by Abdullah Ahmad Badawi
Party political offices
Preceded by Hussein Onn	Deputy President of the United Malays National Organisation; 1976–1981	Succeeded by Musa Hitam
Preceded by Hussein Onn	President of the United Malays National Organisation; 1981–2003	Succeeded by Abdullah Ahmad Badawi
New title	Chairman of Pakatan Harapan; 2016–2020	Succeeded by Anwar Ibrahim
