= Personal life of Mahathir Mohamad =

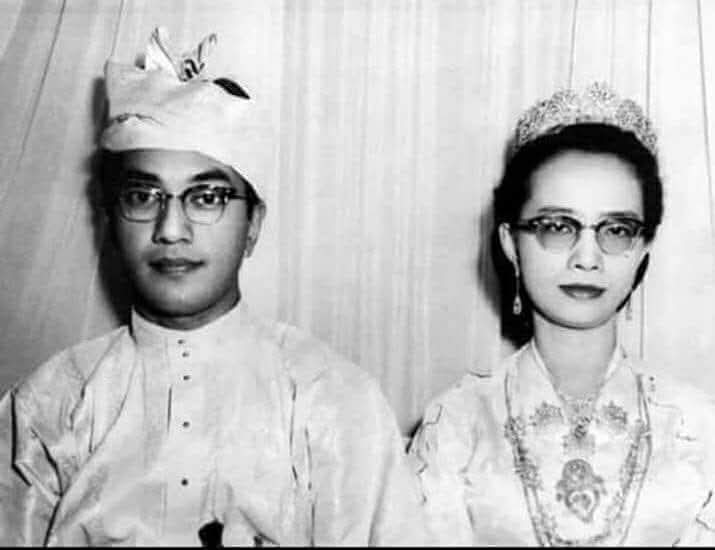
Mahathir and Siti Hasmah's wedding day on 5 August 1956

Mahathir Mohamad (born 10 July 1925) is a Malaysian politician, author, and physician who served as the country's prime minister for a total of 24 years across two non-consecutive terms, from 1981 to 2003 and again from 2018 to 2020. He is Malaysia's longest-serving prime minister and played a crucial role in the nation's modernization and economic development.

Mahathir's hobbies include sailing, horse riding and carpentry. He has built a functioning steam train and a boat. Mahathir attributed his longevity to disciplined eating habits, reading newspapers daily, exercising and maintaining upright posture. His favourite song is "My Way". Mahathir once revealed that he owns close to 40 horses, which were gifted to him. An avid reader, his favourite authors are Wilbur Smith and Jeffrey Archer. Mahathir, known as a workaholic, humorously remarked in 2019 that KSM is the award he adores, explaining that it stood for Kerja Sampai Mati (work till death).

According to the United Press International (UPI), Mahathir enjoys activities such as cooking and driving his family to downtown restaurants, reflecting a preference for simplicity in his personal life. Despite Malaysian culture's traditional emphasis on courtesy and tolerance, Mahathir is known for his focus on detail and emphasis on swift decision-making. Speaking to Malaysiakini, Mahathir's granddaughter, Ineza, described him as a family-oriented man who enjoys spending time with his family and joking around with his grandchildren. His longevity has sparked various theories, including rumors of blood transfusion therapy, similar to urban legends surrounding other leaders. When asked about this in the 1990s, Mahathir simply chuckled and responded with one word: "Pharmaton," a brand of Vitamin C capsules.

On 22 March 1976, Mahathir was involved in a car accident near Sekinchan. No one was injured, and he continued his journey in a police escort car to officiate school events.

In 2019, Mahathir stated that he had maintained a weight of 62 kg for the past 40 years.

== Childhood home ==
Mahathir's childhood home in Alor Setar, was opened to the public on 19 December 1992. Named Rumah Kelahiran Mahathir Mohamad, it showcases items such as photographs, personal documents, and medical instruments from his early life. The restoration project, led by the National Archives, was their second after P. Ramlee's house in Penang.

== Marriage and family ==
While in college, he met his future wife, Siti Hasmah, who was also a medical student. They married in August 1956, when Mahathir was 31 and Siti Hasmah was 30. Their daughter, Marina, viewed this as progressive since it was considered a late marriage for their generation. He and Siti Hasmah had their first child, Marina, in 1957, before conceiving three others, Mirzan, Mokhzani, and Mukhriz, as well as adopting three more, Melinda, Maizura and Mazhar, over the following 28 years. On 5 August 2021, Mahathir celebrated his 65th wedding anniversary with Siti Hasmah. On 5 August 2026, Mahathir celebrated his 70th wedding anniversary with Siti Hasmah. Siti Hasmah died on 28 September 2026, aged 100.

== Health issues ==
Mahathir has faced several health challenges, including heart problems, pneumonia, and chronic coughs caused by lung infections. However, he mentioned during the International Convention on Biotechnology in 2002 that he successfully overcame his chronic cough by consuming a Chinese medicine containing Tiger Milk Mushroom.

On 22 August 1981, Mahathir fainted from exhaustion during a speech in Kedah but quickly recovered and resumed duties by meeting Thailand's Prime Minister in Bangkok on August 23. Later, he took a two-week vacation in Spain and Portugal to rest.

On 18 January 1989, Mahathir was admitted to the hospital due to chest pains, and subsequently underwent bypass surgery. Despite his doctor's recommendation for surgery in the US, he insisted on being treated in Malaysia to demonstrate confidence in local medical services. Reflecting on the decision, he noted, “As a doctor myself, I understood the risks, including the possibility of not surviving, as the procedure was not common at the time.” After his recovery, Mahathir left the country on March 12 for visits to London, Spain, and Morocco, where he also met with the Spanish Prime Minister Felipe González. He returned to the country on April 3 and resumed official duties the following day.

On 2 April 1999, Mahathir was admitted to the National Heart Institute (IJN) due to a lung infection after returning from Mecca. He was discharged on 12 April after 11 days of treatment and was advised to rest at home and avoid visitors. Mahathir resumed his duties on 19 April after a week of rest following his treatment.

On 9 November 2006, Mahathir suffered a mild heart attack and was subsequently transferred to the general ward of the IJN after a stable night in the Coronary Care Unit (CCU). He was discharged from the IJN on 14 November.

On 2 September 2007, Mahathir was admitted to the IJN and subsequently underwent his second coronary bypass there successfully. On 13 September, he was moved out of the Intensive Care Unit to a regular ward. On 23 September, he underwent a three-hour procedure to remove infected tissue from a wound. On 25 September, the IJN stated that Mahathir is conscious with his vital parameters stable as he is eased off his support medication. After 50 days in hospital, Mahathir was discharged from the IJN on 21 October.

He was hospitalised for treatment of another chest infection in Australia in October 2010. On 18 November 2013, Mahathir was admitted to the IJN due to a chest infection and underwent treatment, physiotherapy, and monitoring. On 9 August 2016, he admitted to the IJN again to receive treatment for a chest infection. In February 2018, Mahathir was admitted to the IJN for a chest infection after experiencing a bout of coughing. The following year, as prime minister, he attracted attention when he suffered a nosebleed at a press conference.

On 7 March and 27 March 2021, Mahathir received two doses of the COVID-19 vaccine.

In December 2021, Mahathir was admitted to the IJN for a medical check-up and observation. He was discharged after several days. In January 2022, Mahathir underwent an unspecified elective medical procedure at the IJN. He was readmitted later the same month, and placed in the coronary care unit. He continued rehabilitation and treatment after being discharged. Meanwhile, rumors about his health spread widely, prompting the government to urge respect for his family's privacy.

In August 2022, Mahathir tested positive for COVID-19 and was admitted to the IJN for observation. He was discharged after receiving treatment.

In August 2023, Mahathir was hospitalised with an infection, he was discharged days later. In January 2024, he was again hospitalised due to an infection, and again six months later in July due to coughing.

On 15 October 2024, Mahathir was admitted to the hospital due to a respiratory infection; He was discharged on 28 October.

On 10 July 2025, he celebrated his 100th birthday by making a special live podcast at his office in Putrajaya. He described his centennial as being a "normal day".

In April 2026, Mahathir revealed in his podcast that after suffering a fall earlier in the year whilst exercising, he has lost the ability to control one of his legs. He stated that he "can stand now but I can't control the leg. It is as if I don't have legs".

== Sleeping habits ==
Following the 1997 Asian financial crisis, Mahathir adopted a habit of working long hours, dedicating himself to stabilizing Malaysia's economy and governance. Despite his demanding schedule, he managed brief afternoon naps to maintain his productivity.

In 2018, Mahathir returned as prime minister and undertook extensive efforts to reform the government. He often worked late into the night, reading over 200 documents until 4:00–5:00 AM and resuming work by 7:00 AM.

== Driving habits ==
Mahathir is an avid fan of cars and driving. After returning as prime minister in 2018, he drove around Kuala Lumpur to observe the capital and later took a Ferrari for a spin around the illuminated Sepang International Circuit (SIC). When not behind the wheel, he was chauffeured by Johor’s Sultan Ibrahim Iskandar in a first-generation Proton Saga, a car he had gifted to the ruler’s father in 1985, and also experienced riding in an autonomous Proton Exora.

On 23 September 2024, Mahathir shared a video of himself driving at the Sepang Circuit. In the three-minute video, he accelerated and reached a speed of 154 km per hour.

== Security incidents and assassination threats ==
Mahathir has been the target of various security incidents throughout his political career, including bomb hoaxes, assassination plots, and physical attacks. These incidents, often tied to his political decisions and prominent role in Malaysian politics, were successfully thwarted or resolved without major harm.
