= Jeanne Abdullah =

Spouse of former 5th Prime Minister of Malaysia,

Yang Amat Berbahagia Tun Datin Paduka Seri Jeanne Abdullah SSM SPMS DUNM DA
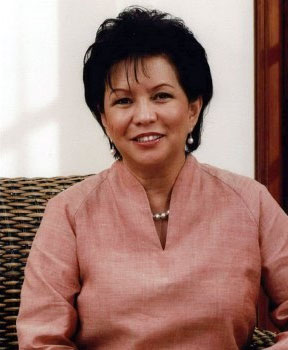

Spouse of the Prime Minister of Malaysia
- In role 9 June 2007 – 3 April 2009
- Monarch: Mizan Zainal Abidin
- Prime Minister: Abdullah Ahmad Badawi
- Preceded by: Endon Mahmood
- Succeeded by: Rosmah Mansor

Personal details
- Born: Jeanne Danker; 29 July 1953 (age 73) Kuala Lumpur, Federation of Malaya
- Spouse(s): Othman Mahmood Abdullah Ahmad Badawi (m. 2007; died 2025)
- Children: 2 (including Nadiah Kimie and Nadene Kimie)

Jeanne Danker Abdullah (née Danker; born 29 July 1953) is a Malaysian hotelier who served as the spouse of the prime minister of Malaysia from 2007 to 2009, as the wife of Abdullah Ahmad Badawi. She married Abdullah in 2007 while he was in office and is the second wife after the death of Abdullah's first wife, Endon Mahmood.

Jeanne was formerly married to the younger brother of Abdullah's first late wife. She was also a manager at the Seri Perdana residential complex and has two children from her previous marriage. However, earlier in March that year, the premier dismissed rumours about his plans to remarry even though the rumours had been circulating for more than a year.

== Early life ==
Born Jeanne Danker on 29 July 1953 in Kuala Lumpur to a Roman Catholic Portuguese-Eurasian (Kristang) family with roots in the state of Malacca, she was the eldest of four siblings. She is an alumna of SMK Assunta in Petaling Jaya, Selangor.

Jeanne later converted to Islam at the age of 23, when she married her first husband, Othman Mahmood, who was the younger brother of Abdullah's deceased first wife, Endon Mahmood.

Jeanne worked in the hotel management field at major hotels including Kuala Lumpur Hilton and the Pan Pacific Hotel. At one point, she was supervisor of the Malaysian Deputy Prime Minister's official residence while Abdullah Badawi was Deputy Prime Minister, and became the manager of Seri Perdana, the Prime Minister's residence, when Abdullah assumed the premiership.

== Family ==
Jeanne has two daughters, Nadiah Kimie, 48 and Nadene Kimie, 46 from her previous marriage. Nadiah runs a visual communications company in Kuala Lumpur. Nadene is involved in the fashion industry, dealing with fashion-related and lifestyle projects.

== Marriage with Abdullah ==
On 9 June 2007, Jeanne Abdullah married Prime Minister Abdullah Ahmad Badawi in a private ceremony held at the official residence, Seri Perdana, in Putrajaya. The marriage was solemnised by Haji Abd Manaf Mat, an imam from the Putra Mosque, and witnessed by Abdullah's son, Kamaluddin, and son-in-law, Khairy Jamaluddin. The event was attended by close family members, including Abdullah’s children and grandchildren, Jeanne’s two daughters, and several relatives of Abdullah’s late wife, Tun Endon Mahmood.

Following the ceremony, the couple visited Endon’s grave at the Taman Selatan Muslim Cemetery in Putrajaya.

On 11 June 2007, Jeanne accompanied Abdullah on her first official engagement as the prime minister’s spouse, attending a banquet in Brunei hosted by Sultan Hassanal Bolkiah in conjunction with the wedding of Princess Majeedah.

At a press conference, Abdullah stated that he had known Jeanne for over two decades, noting that she had previously been married to Othman Mahmood, the younger brother of Endon Mahmood. He clarified that there had been no prior arrangement or instruction from Endon regarding the marriage, but acknowledged that Endon had entrusted Jeanne with the management of the official residence during her lifetime. He also stated that no bersanding ceremony or exchange of hantaran (wedding gifts) took place due to it being his second marriage.

== Public life ==
In December 2007, Jeanne Abdullah was appointed as the second Chancellor of Open University Malaysia, succeeding the late Tun Endon Mahmood, the first wife of then Prime Minister Abdullah Ahmad Badawi. She also serves as Chairperson of Landskap Malaysia and the Tropical Rainforest Conservation and Research Centre, and is the Executive Chairman of Secretariat Malaysia Prihatin. Additionally, she is the patron of the Paralympic Council of Malaysia.

In March 2018, Jeanne was redesignated as the independent and non-executive chairman of TRC Synergy Berhad, a construction and property development company listed on Bursa Malaysia. She had joined the company’s board on 1 December 2017, succeeding General (R) Tan Sri Mohd Shahrom Nordin in the chairmanship.

== Honours ==
Upon marriage to Abdullah, Jeanne was automatically conferred the female version of her husband's honorific title, Dato' Seri, which is Datin Seri. Later on 3 April 2009, the King of Malaysia, Yang di-Pertuan Agong Tuanku Mizan Zainal Abidin at Istana Negara awarded the Seri Setia Mahkota (SSM) upon Jeanne. The SSM carried the honorific title Tun for the recipients. The award was conferred by the Yang di-Pertuan Agong in conjunction to the handing over of Prime Minister office from her husband to Najib Razak.

=== Honours of Malaysia ===
- Malaysia
  - Grand Commander of the Order of Loyalty to the Crown of Malaysia (SSM) – Tun (2009)
- Malacca
  - Knight Grand Commander of the Premier and Exalted Order of Malacca (DUNM) – Datuk Seri Utama (2007)
- Sarawak
  - Knight Commander of the Order of the Star of Hornbill Sarawak (DA) – Datuk Amar (2008)
- Selangor
  - Knight Grand Commander of the Order of the Crown of Selangor (SPMS) – Datin Paduka Seri (2007)

== See also ==
- Spouse of the Prime Minister of Malaysia
