= Endon Mahmood =

Wife of Abdullah Ahmad Badawi (1940–2005)

Yang Amat Berbahagia Tun Datin Paduka Endon Mahmood Ambak SSM SPMS SPMK SPTJ SSAP
- هند محمود أعماق
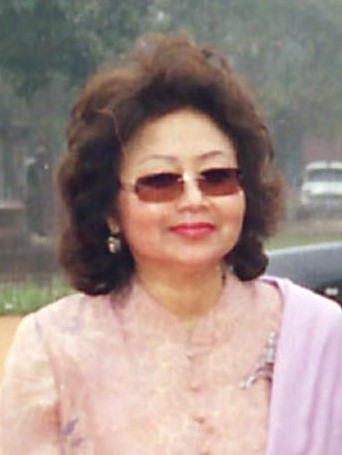
- Endon Mahmood in 2004

Spouse of the Prime Minister of Malaysia
- In role 31 October 2003 – 20 October 2005
- Monarch: Sirajuddin
- Prime Minister: Abdullah Ahmad Badawi
- Preceded by: Siti Hasmah Mohamad Ali
- Succeeded by: Jeanne Abdullah

Spouse of the Deputy Prime Minister of Malaysia
- In role 29 January 1999 – 31 October 2003
- Monarch: Sirajuddin
- Prime Minister: Mahathir Mohamad
- Deputy: Tun Abdullah Ahmad Badawi
- Preceded by: Wan Azizah Wan Ismail
- Succeeded by: Rosmah Mansor

Personal details
- Born: 24 December 1940 Klang, Selangor, British Malaya (now Malaysia)
- Died: 20 October 2005 (aged 64) Putrajaya, Malaysia
- Resting place: Pusara Negara, Precinct 20, Putrajaya, Malaysia
- Spouse: Tun Abdullah Ahmad Badawi (m. 1965)
- Children: 2
- Parents: Datuk Mahmood Ambak (father); Datin Mariam Abdullah (mother)

Endon binti Mahmood Ambak (Jawi: هند بنت محمود أعماق; 24 December 1940 – 20 October 2005) was the first wife of the 5th Prime Minister of Malaysia, Tun Abdullah Ahmad Badawi. She died from breast cancer on 20 October 2005.

== Early life ==
Endon was born to Datuk Mahmood Ambak, a Malay man, and Datin Mariam Abdullah, a Japanese woman. Endon had ten other siblings, including her twin sister Noraini as well as other sisters Nonni, Rahmah and Aizah. She was born in Klang, Selangor on 24 December 1940.

Endon's father worked as a mining assistant in the Department of Mines, and subsequently transferred to Perak to help oversee about 60 mines in the district of Kampar. Endon spent much of her childhood days in Kampar and received her early education at the Anglo Chinese School. She later went on to attend St. Mary's School in Kuala Lumpur.

== Marriage ==
Endon met Abdullah while she was working at the Federal Establishment Office (now the Public Service Department) in the 1960s and they were married in 1965. Endon later retired from civil service in 1976. Together with Abdullah, Endon had two children: son Datuk Kamaluddin Abdullah, a business tycoon (married to Azrene, now Fareshah) and a daughter, Nori Abdullah (married to Khairy Jamaluddin). Both Abdullah and Endon had four grandchildren.

== Social contributions ==
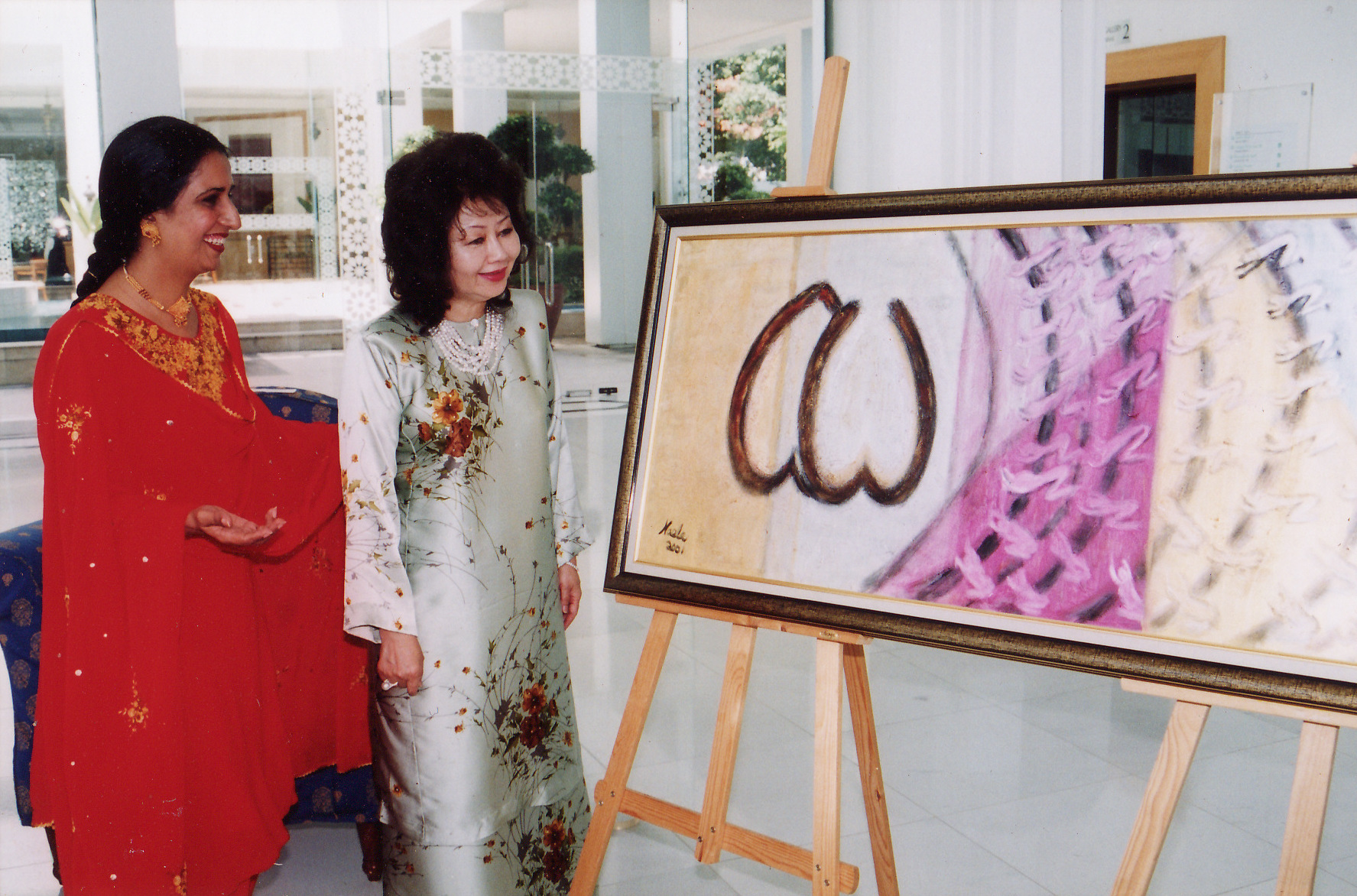
Her Excellency Naela Chohan of Pakistan & Datin Seri Endon Mahmood at the Museum of Islamic Heritage, Kuala Lumpur (1999)

Endon is noted for her contributions to traditional fabric art such as the batik and songket. For example, she launched Campaigns and exhibitions such as the "Batik Extravaganza" which was held in early December 2003 and the Malaysian Batik Movement, "Creation for the World". She was also a patron of the theatre.

== Illness and death ==
Endon Mahmood was diagnosed with breast cancer in 2003, shortly before the death of her twin sister, Noraini, who had also been diagnosed with the disease and died in January of the same year. Before this, Endon had undergone a radical mastectomy on 18 April 2002, followed by 33 sessions of radiation therapy and subsequent physiotherapy at Saint John's Health Center in Los Angeles, California.

She continued receiving treatment in Los Angeles, returning there in June 2005 for chemotherapy. She returned to Malaysia on 2 October 2005 and was later transferred to Seri Perdana, the Prime Minister's official residence, after a two-week stay at Putrajaya Hospital.

Endon died on 20 October 2005 at the age of 64 after a prolonged illness. Her funeral was conducted at Seri Perdana and the Putra Mosque in Putrajaya, where the funeral prayers were held. She was buried at the Muslim cemetery in Taman Selatan (that is now a part of Pusara Negara), Precinct 20, Putrajaya.

== Honours ==
Universiti Teknologi Malaysia conferred Endon Mahmood an Honorary Doctorate in Humanities in August 2004.

On 24 August 2004, Endon Mahmood was awarded the Tun Fatimah Award by the National Council of Women's Organisations in recognition of her contributions to community service. She was posthumously conferred the Order of Loyalty to the Crown of Malaysia (Seri Setia Mahkota Malaysia, SSM), which carries the honorific title Tun, on 6 June 2009 in conjunction with the official birthday of the Yang di-Pertuan Agong, Tuanku Mizan Zainal Abidin.

=== Honour of Malaysia ===
- Malaysia
  - Grand Commander of the Order of Loyalty to the Crown of Malaysia (SSM) – Tun (2009; posthumously)
- Kelantan
  - Knight Grand Commander of the Order of the Crown of Kelantan (SPMK) – Dato' (2004)
- Negeri Sembilan
  - Knight Grand Commander of the Grand Order of Tuanku Jaafar (SPTJ) – Dato' Seri (2005)
- Pahang
  - Knight Grand Companion of the Order of Sultan Ahmad Shah of Pahang (SSAP) – Dato' Sri (2002)
- Selangor
  - Knight Grand Commander of the Order of the Crown of Selangor (SPMS) – Datin Paduka Seri (2002)

=== Places named after her ===
Several places and honours were named after her, including:

- Kolej Datin Seri Endon, a residential college at Universiti Teknologi Malaysia, Skudai, Johor.
- Piala Seri Endon, batik and kebaya competition.
- Galeri Seri Endon @ Central Market, Kuala Lumpur
- Dewan Seri Endon, Puspanitapuri De' Seri Endon, Putrajaya

== See also ==
- Spouse of the Prime Minister of Malaysia
