= Kolej Tunku Kurshiah =

College in Seremban, Negeri Sembilan, Malaysia

Coordinates: 2.7301°N 101.7934°E

- TKC

Location
- Kolej Tunku Kurshiah, 71760, Seremban; Bandar Enstek, Negeri Sembilan; Malaysia

Information
- Type: Public, All-girls boarding school, Sekolah Berasrama Penuh
- Motto: Rajin dan Usaha, Tangga Kemajuan (Diligence and effort are the steps to success)
- Established: 1947
- Principal: Fathiiyah Mohd Pozi@Mohd Fauzi
- Grades: Form 1 - Form 5 and International Baccalaureate Diploma Programme
- Enrollment: N/A
- Language: Malay, English
- Classrooms: 5 classes for each form (names: T, K, C, E, N )
- Houses: Siti Zawiah (Yellow), Selendang Delima (Green), Tun Fatimah (Blue), Mahsuri (Red)
- Colours: Green and white
- Yearbook: Saujana
- Affiliations: Sekolah Berasrama Penuh, Ministry of Education (Malaysia)
- Alumni: MGC/TKC Old Girls Association
- Website: tkc.edu.my

Kolej Tunku Kurshiah (English: Tunku Kurshiah College; abbreviated TKC; formerly known as Malay Girls College; abbreviated MGC), is a premier boarding school located in Seremban, Negeri Sembilan. TKC is an all-girls residential school (Sekolah Berasrama Penuh) and the first fully residential girls' school in Malaysia. In 2010, the school received the Sekolah Berprestasi Tinggi or High Performance School title, a title awarded to the 20 schools in Malaysia that have met stringent criteria including academic achievement, strength of alumni, international recognition, network, and linkages. The school is specialised in leadership, innovation, and invention.

== History ==
Tunku Kurshiah College was established as Malay Girls College in 1947. It was initially located at a piece of land located at the 2 1/2 Mile of Jalan Damansara, Kuala Lumpur. It was officially opened by Lady Gent, the wife of Sir Edward Gent, the Governor of Malayan Union. The place is now known as Bukit Damansara.

In April 1962, the college moved to a 25 acres (100,000 m^{2}) site at Bukit Merbah, Jalan Tunku Kurshiah, Seremban. The college changed its name to Kolej Tunku Kurshiah, in honour of the first Raja Permaisuri Agong. It was formalised when the college was declared open by Almarhum Tuanku Munawir ibni Almarhum Tuanku Abdul Rahman, the then Yang Di Pertuan Besar of Negeri Sembilan on 24 May 1963.

In 1986, the school were chosen as one of 20 pilot schools for Computer Literacy Pilot Project and received Apple II.

In 2000, TKC was chosen as one of the schools to participate in the Malaysia Smart Schools flagship application of the Multimedia Super Corridor (MSC). The school is the first batch of Cluster Schools which granted itself autonomy to select its own students in 2007. The school niche area is student leadership, English proficiency, and research and development (R & D). Three years later, in 2010, the school again was selected to be among the first High Performing Schools (Sekolah Berprestasi Tinggi) with niche at leadership, innovation and invention.

In 2011, the school band was featured in a flashmob style, reality programme, Refleksi Orkestra in conjunction with Orkestra RTM 50 Golden Jubilee.

The school moved to its new premise in Bandar Enstek, Nilai in January 2013. TKC new campus has two main blocks, namely academic lower secondary and upper secondary, an administrator block which consists of an office, teachers' chambers, libraries, laboratories, and a main hall which can accommodate 1,000 people. The main academic block can accommodate as many as 650 Ministry's stream students and 100 International Baccalaureate students. The university-style campus also has dormitory blocks, a surau, warden's residence, cafeteria, convenient sports fields and arenas, as well as WiFi. The campus has an area as large as 17.4 hectares, built with cost approximately RM 75 million. The process of moving to new premises was documented by TV3 (Malaysia) documentary programme Majalah Tiga.

== Notable alumni ==
- Tengku Ampuan Bariah - Tengku Ampuan Besar (Queen) of Terengganu, royal consort to the 16th Sultan of Terengganu.
- Tunku Puteri Intan Safinaz - Tunku Temenggong of Kedah
- Tunku Naquiah - Tunku Dara of Negeri Sembilan
- Tengku Maimun Tuan Mat - the 10th Chief Justice of Malaysia
- Mazlan Othman - Director of the United Nations Office for Outer Space Affairs, founding Director General of the Malaysian National Space Agency.
- Wan Azizah Wan Ismail - First female Deputy Prime Minister of Malaysia, first President of the People's Justice Party (Malaysia) and the 11th Leader of the Opposition
- Rosmah Mansor - wife of the sixth Prime Minister of Malaysia, Dato Sri Haji Mohammad Najib Razak
- Robiah Ibrahim - the first woman to develop the latest method of lightning protection
- Nik Safiah Karim - Educationist and champions for women development and rights
- Zuraidah Atan - lawyer, Chairman of Yayasan Sukarelawan Siswa (YSS) Malaysia, honorary adviser of the National Cancer Society Malaysia (NCSM), member of the governing board of Universiti Sains Malaysia
- Rafiah Salim - Lawyer, first female Vice-Chancellor in Malaysia, Universiti Malaya
- Noriah Kasnon - Deputy Minister of Women, Family and Community, Member of the Parliament of Malaysia for the Sungai Besar constituency
- Marina Mahathir - newspaper columnist and social activist
- Shahrizat Abdul Jalil - Senator, former Minister of Women, Family and Community Development, Chairlady of the Women's wing of the United Malays National Organisation(UMNO)
- Alizatul Khair Osman Khairudin - Judge at Court of Appeal of Malaysia
- Ilani Ishak - former Member of the Parliament of Malaysia for the Kota Bharu constituency, Chairman of the Cabinet Committee Promote Understanding and Harmony Among Religious Adherents
- Putri Saniah Megat Abd Rahman - President of Librarians Association of Malaysia
- Kamilia Ibrahim - Kamilia Ibrahim & Co (KICO) law firm principal partner, former Vice Chairlady of the Women's wing of UMNO.
- Muzlifah Haniffa - dermatologist and immunologist
