= Malay College Youth Development Summit =

Student-led conference in Malaysia

The Malay College Youth Development Summit (MCYDS) is a premier international student-led conference in Malaysia established in 2008 by The Malay College Kuala Kangsar (MCKK). It brings together youth delegates from various countries for 9 days to discuss global issues, foster leadership, and build networks, often focusing on STEM and sustainable development.

== Background ==
The Malay College Youth Development Summit is the first-ever program organized by The Malay College Kuala Kangsar in 2008 at the international level and is the first school in Malaysia to organize similar events. This program has given a great impact when it is able to highlight the quality of students' leadership in organizing events internationally. This is evident by students' involvement in the students' working committee which is the backbone for the smooth running and success of the program.

In line with one of the objectives this program, The Malay College Youth Development Summit provides opportunities for students, especially MCKK students to generally engage in international programmes that allow them to interact, think globally and apply knowledge obtained from this program. The program encourages students to be competitive, disciplined, and confident.

== Previous Editions ==
The programme started with its first edition in the year 2008 and was held continuously until 2019 when COVID-19 caused a nation-wide lockdown. The summit resumed with its 13th edition in 2026.

Below are the themes of The Malay College Youth Development Summit from 2008 to 2026.

- 2008: Students: The World Youth
- 2009: Students: The World Youth
- 2010: Preserving Heritage Promoting Development
- 2011: The WWW Project; What Works Well
- 2012: World Peace Begins in School
- 2013: Grooming Green Societies
- 2014: I² - Invention & Innovation
- 2015: Developing Future Leaders
- 2016: Patriotism and Youth Identity
- 2017: Youth and Social Innovation
- 2018: Digital Citizenship and Global Connectivity
- 2019: #STEMulate
- 2020-2025: Not hosted due to COVID
- 2026: Peace: Awake, Aware, Arise

== Participation ==
The school usually sends invitations to top schools within the country and also internationally. Prominent schools involved include: Tunku Kurshiah College (TKC), Sekolah Sultan Alam Shah (SAS), (draft)
