= Rahah Noah =

Malaysian socialite

Yang Amat Berbahagia Tun Dato' Indera Rahah Mohamed Noah SSM SIMP SPDK PNBS
- راحة محمد نوح
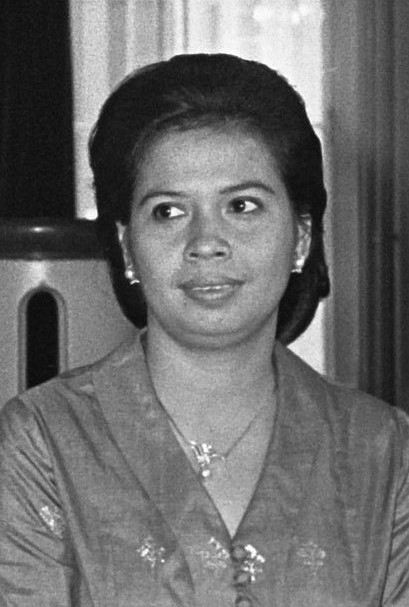
- Rahah Noah in 1968

Spouse of the Prime Minister of Malaysia
- In role 22 September 1970 – 14 January 1976
- Monarchs: Abdul Halim; Yahya Petra
- Prime Minister: Abdul Razak Hussein
- Preceded by: Sharifah Rodziah Syed Alwi Barakbah
- Succeeded by: Suhailah Noah

Spouse of the Deputy Prime Minister of Malaysia
- In role 31 August 1957 – 22 September 1970
- Monarchs: Abdul Rahman; Hishamuddin; Syed Putra; Ismail Nasiruddin; Abdul Halim
- Prime Minister: Tunku Abdul Rahman
- Deputy: Abdul Razak Hussein
- Succeeded by: Norashikin Mohd Seth

Personal details
- Born: 11 June 1933 Muar, Johor, Unfederated Malay States, British Malaya (now Malaysia)
- Died: 18 December 2020 (aged 87) Kuala Lumpur, Malaysia
- Resting place: Makam Pahlawan, Masjid Negara, Kuala Lumpur
- Spouse: Abdul Razak Hussein (m. 1952; died 1976)
- Children: 5 (including Najib and Nazir)
- Parents: Mohamed Noah Omar (father); Maimun Abdul Manaf (mother)
- Relatives: Nazifuddin Najib (grandson); Suhailah Noah (sister); Abdul Rahman Ya'kub (affinal); Nizar Najib (grandson)

Rahah binti Mohamed Noah (Jawi: راحة بنت محمد نوح; 11 June 1933 – 18 December 2020) was the wife of the second Malaysian Prime Minister Tun Abdul Razak Hussein (1922–1976) and mother of the sixth Prime Minister Najib Razak. Her father Mohamed Noah Omar (1898–1991) was the first Speaker of the Dewan Rakyat, the lower house of parliament, and the third President of the Dewan Negara, the upper house of parliament.

== Biography ==
Rahah was born on 11 June 1933 in Muar, Johor. She was the youngest of Mohamed Noah Omar's ten children. While attending secondary school in Johor Bahru, Rahah was introduced to Abdul Razak Hussein, who was an active member of the United Malays National Organisation (UMNO). This organization was founded by Taib Andak, a friend of Abdul Razak, while studying in London. They married on 4 September 1952.

Abdul Razak became the second Prime Minister of Malaysia in 1970. As the prime minister's spouse, she served as President of the Girl Guides Association of Malaysia and patron of the Muslim Women's Action Organisation (Pertiwi). In 1976, Razak died in office, leaving Rahah widowed at a relatively young age of 43.

She was the chancellor of Universiti Tun Abdul Razak, the university founded in honour of her husband. Since Abdul Razak was the prime minister who established diplomatic relations with the People's Republic of China, all PRC ambassadors made a courtesy call on Rahah upon arriving in Malaysia.

In an interview conducted in 2011, Rahah said she spent most of her time attending religious classes with friends.

== Death ==
Tun Rahah died on 18 December 2020 at the Prince Court Medical Centre in Kuala Lumpur following a short illness, at the age of 87. Former Prime Minister Mahathir Mohamad described Tun Rahah as among the last from the independence generation who contributed invaluable services and sacrifices for the country. Mahathir was among the national leaders and acquaintances present to pay their last respects to Tun Rahah.

She was laid to rest at the Makam Pahlawan (Heroes' Mausoleum) near Masjid Negara, Kuala Lumpur beside the grave of her sister Tun Suhailah Mohamed Noah, who died on 4 October 2014.

== Family ==
Abdul Razak and Rahah had five children:

- Najib Razak (born 1953), the sixth Prime Minister of Malaysia. In 2020, Najib was convicted of corruption in relation to the 1MDB scandal during his premiership.
- Ahmad Johari (born 1955)
- Mohd Nizam (born 1957), the son-in-law to former Chief Minister from 1970 to 1981 as well as Yang di-Pertua Negeri of Sarawak from 1981 to 1986, Tun Abdul Rahman Ya'kub, being married to one of his daughters, Khadijah.
- Mohd Nazim (born 1963), businessman cum husband to former TV presenter and AIDIJUMA entrepreneur, Norjuma Habib Mohammed.
- Mohd Nazir (born 1965), the former chief executive of CIMB, one of the largest financial services companies in South-East Asia.

== Honours ==
=== Honours of Malaysia ===
- Malaysia
  - Grand Commander of the Order of Loyalty to the Crown of Malaysia (SSM) – Tun (1976)
- Sarawak
  - Knight Commander of the Order of the Star of Sarawak (PNBS) – Dato Sri (2002)
- Pahang
  - Grand Knight of the Order of the Crown of Pahang (SIMP) – formerly Dato', now Dato' Indera (1973)
- Sabah
  - Grand Commander of the Order of Kinabalu (SPDK) – Datuk Seri Panglima (1974)

=== Places named after her ===
- Taman Tun Rahah, Bukit Katil, Malacca
- Dewan Besar Tun Rahah, Kuala Lumpur
- Masjid Ar-Rahah, Kampung Kerinchi, Kuala Lumpur
- SMKA Tun Hajah Rahah, Sabak Bernam, Selangor

== In popular culture ==
Rahah has been portrayed in a documentary, theater and films. She was portrayed by Fauziah Latiff in the theater Tun Razak Musical (2010) and a film played by Faezah Elai in Tanda Putera (2013).

== See also ==
- Spouse of the Prime Minister of Malaysia
