= Noorainee Abdul Rahman =

Spouse & wife of Muhyiddin Yassin

Yang Berbahagia Puan Sri Datin Paduka Noorainee Abdul Rahman SPMJ SPDK SSAP PIS
- نورعيني عبد الرحمن
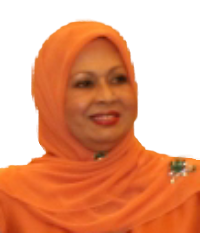

Spouse of the Prime Minister of Malaysia
- In role 1 March 2020 – 16 August 2021; Spouse of the Caretaker: 16 – 21 August 2021
- Monarch: Abdullah
- Prime Minister: Muhyiddin Yassin
- Preceded by: Siti Hasmah
- Succeeded by: Muhaini Zainal Abidin

Spouse of the Deputy Prime Minister of Malaysia
- In role 10 April 2009 – 28 July 2015
- Deputy Prime Minister: Muhyiddin Yassin
- Preceded by: Rosmah Mansor
- Succeeded by: Hamidah Khamis

Personal details
- Born: Noorainee binti Abdul Rahman; 21 April 1949 (age 77) Muar, Johor, Federation of Malaya (now Malaysia)
- Spouse: Muhyiddin Yassin (m. 1972)
- Children: 4

Noorainee binti Abdul Rahman (Jawi: نورعيني بنت عبد الرحمن; born 21 April 1949) is the wife of Muhyiddin Yassin, who served as the 8th Prime Minister of Malaysia from March 2020 to August 2021, 10th and former Deputy Prime Minister of Malaysia from April 2009 to July 2015. She is known for the school-in-hospital project.

== Marriage ==
She was married to Muhyiddin Yassin in 1972 with whom she had 4 children, 2 sons and 2 daughters.

== Family ==
They have four children, Fakhri Yassin Mahiaddin, a corporate figure; Nabilah Mahiaddin,; Najwa Mahiaddin, a singer and Farhan Yassin Mahiaddin, also known as Moslem Priest as his stage name.

One of her grandchildren, Iman Alisha Datuk Fakhri Yassin was an athlete representing the Federal Territory in 2018 Sukma Games at Perak Darul Ridzuan at the age of 13. Her sister, Iman Suraya is also active in rhythmic gymnastics sports as well as her siblings, Iman Arissa and Iman Aleena.

== School in-Hospital project ==
She is the Patron, the Internal Conscience Program of the School in-Hospital project. It was her inspiration to give students and students the opportunity to get an education when they were hospitalized. It is a collaboration between the Ministry of Education, the Ministry of Health and the Nurul Yaqeen Foundation.

== Orchid hybrids ==
Malaysian Agricultural Research and Development Institute (MARDI) has produced two hybrid orchid breeds in conjunction with her name, Aranda Puan Sri Noorainee and Mokara Puan Sri Noorainee.

== Community activities ==
- Vice-President, Charity and Welfare of Wives of the Federal Minister and Deputy Minister of Malaysia (BAKTI)
- The President, the Wife's Charity Agency of Johor State Legislative Assembly of Barisan Nasional (JUITA Johor)
- Patron, PUSPANITA
  - Ministry of Home Affairs Malaysia
  - Ministry of Education Malaysia
  - Ministry of International Trade and Industry Malaysia
  - Ministry of Agriculture and Agro-Based Industry of Malaysia
  - Ministry of Domestic Trade and Consumer Affairs Malaysia
  - Ministry of Youth and Sports Malaysia
    - Patron, Conscience Program: In-Hospital School
- Patron, Malaysian Gymnastics Federation
- Patron, SPWinds, Sekolah Seri Puteri, Cyberjaya

== Honours ==
- Johor
  - Knight Grand Commander of the Order of the Crown of Johor (SPMJ) – Datin Paduka (2013)
  - Second Class of the Sultan Ibrahim Medal (PIS II) (1988)
- Pahang
  - Knight Grand Companion of the Order of Sultan Ahmad Shah of Pahang (SSAP) – Dato' Sri (2014)
- Sabah
  - Grand Commander of the Order of Kinabalu (SPDK) – Datuk Seri Panglima (2021)

== Honorific titles ==
=== Wife of Deputy Prime Minister (2009–2015) ===
Yang Amat Berbahagia Puan Sri Datin Paduka Hajah Noorainee binti Haji Abdul Rahman

=== Wife of the Minister of Home Affairs (2018–2020) ===
Yang Berbahagia Puan Sri Datin Paduka Hajah Noorainee binti Haji Abdul Rahman

=== Wife of the Prime Minister (2020–2021) ===
Yang Amat Berbahagia Puan Sri Datin Paduka Hajah Noorainee binti Haji Abdul Rahman

== Other titles ==
- She is styled as Yang Berhormat Puan Sri Datin Paduka Hajah Noorainee binti Haji Abdul Rahman when she is not accompanying her husband at the state of Johor
- She is styled as Yang Hormat Puan Sri Dato' Sri Hajah Noorainee binti Haji Abdul Rahman when she is not accompanying her husband at the state of Pahang
- She is styled as Yang Berbahagia Puan Sri Datuk Seri Panglima Hajah Noorainee binti Haji Abdul Rahman when she is not accompanying her husband at the state of Sabah

== See also ==
- Spouse of the Prime Minister of Malaysia
