= Rosmah Mansor =

Wife of Malaysian politician Najib Razak

Yang Berbahagia Dato' Sri Rosmah Mansor DK II (Pahang) SPMK SSAP SPDK SSDK SJMK SIMP DUNM DA
- روسمه منصور
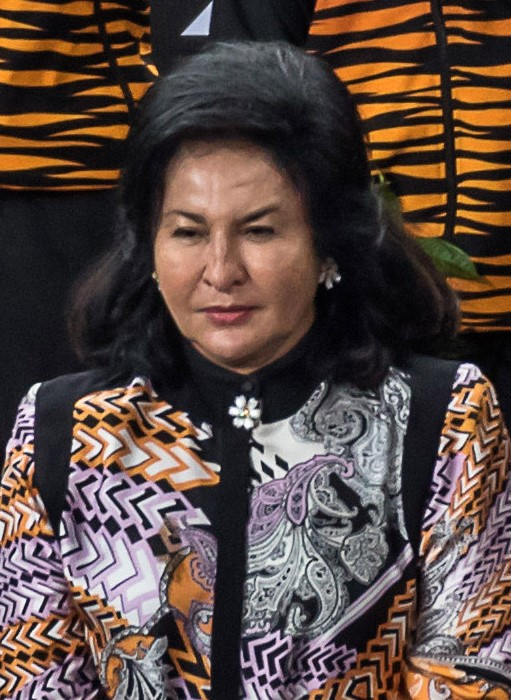
- Rosmah in 2017

Spouse of the Prime Minister of Malaysia
- In role 3 April 2009 – 9 May 2018
- Monarchs: Mizan Zainal Abidin; Abdul Halim; Muhammad V
- Prime Minister: Najib Razak
- Preceded by: Jeanne Abdullah
- Succeeded by: Siti Hasmah

Spouse of the Deputy Prime Minister of Malaysia
- In role 7 January 2003 – 3 April 2009
- Monarchs: Sirajuddin; Mizan Zainal Abidin
- Prime Minister: Abdullah Ahmad Badawi
- Deputy Prime Minister: Najib Razak
- Preceded by: Endon Mahmood
- Succeeded by: Noorainee Abdul Rahman

Personal details
- Born: Rosmah binti Mansor; 10 December 1951 (age 74) Kuala Pilah, Negeri Sembilan, Federation of Malaya
- Spouses: Abdul Aziz Nong Chik (divorced) Najib Razak (m. 1987)
- Children: 4 (including Riza Aziz)
- Education: Kolej Tunku Kurshiah
- Criminal information
- Status: Acquited on 19 December 2024 (22 months ago)
- Criminal charges: Money laundering and tax evasion (17 counts)

Rosmah binti Mansor (Jawi: روسمه بنت منصور; born 10 December 1951) is a Malaysian political spouse who served as the spouse of the prime minister of Malaysia from 2009 to 2018 as the second wife of Najib Razak, the sixth prime minister of Malaysia. Like her husband, she was implicated in the 1MDB scandal. On 1 September 2022, she was found guilty of corruption in relation to a school electricity project, fined $303 million and sentenced to ten years imprisonment. On 19 December 2024, a Malaysian high court acquitted Rosmah of seventeen counts of money laundering and tax evasion due to insufficient evidence.

== Early life and education ==
Rosmah received her secondary education at Kolej Tunku Kurshiah, Negeri Sembilan.

Rosmah was formerly married to Abdul Aziz Nong Chik. They have two children, Riza Aziz and Azrene Soraya. In 1987, she married Najib Razak and they have two children, Nooryana Najwa and Mohd Norashman, and have amassed a huge amount of wealth, which Rosmah claimed to have saved since childhood.

== Corruption ==
=== 1MDB scandal ===
Rosmah and her husband's lavish lifestyle and extravagant purchases while Najib Razak was in power caused anger among the citizens in Malaysia. Following her husband's loss in the Malaysian 14th general election, the couple were under investigation into the 1MDB scandal, in which over USD$7.5 billion went missing from the fund.

On 12 May 2018, three days after her husband and then incumbent prime minister lost the general election, a flight manifest named Najib and Rosmah as passengers of a private jet scheduled to leave from an airport near Kuala Lumpur for Halim Perdanakusuma International Airport in Jakarta. In response, the Immigration Department, upon the orders of Prime Minister Mahathir Mohamad, imposed a travel ban on Rosmah and her husband, barring their exit from the country.

Since 16 May 2018, the Malaysian police have searched six properties linked to Rosmah and Najib as part of the investigation into the 1MDB scandal. Malaysian police seized 284 boxes filled with designer handbags, 72 large luggage bags containing cash in multiple currencies, and other valuables. The Malaysian police commissioner confirmed that the police seized goods with an estimated value of between US$223 and US$273 million. The police described it as the biggest seizure in Malaysian history.

A breakdown of the items seized included:

- 12,000 pieces of jewellery:
  - 2,200 rings
  - 1,400 necklaces
  - 2,100 bracelets
  - 2,800 pairs of earrings
  - 1,600 brooches
  - 14 tiaras
- 423 luxury wristwatches (notably from Rolex, Chopard and Richard Mille)
- 234 luxury sunglasses (notably from Versace and Cartier)
- 567 luxury handbags from 72 brands (notably from Chanel, Prada, Versace, Bijan and Judith Leiber)
  - 272 handbags from Hermès (Birkin bag)
- MYR 116 million in over 26 different currencies.

Rosmah had been summoned three times by the Malaysian Anti-Corruption Commission to assist an investigation into the alleged misappropriation of money banked into her husband's account tied to the 1MDB scandal. The first was on 5 June 2018, where she was questioned for 5 hours; the second on 26 September 2018 for 13 hours; and the third was on 3 October 2018, which led to her arrest on the same day.

On 4 October 2018, Rosmah pleaded not guilty to 17 charges of money laundering involving about MYR7mil at the Sessions Court under the Anti-Money Laundering, Anti-Terrorism and Financing and Proceeds of Unlawful Activities Act. The court set MYR2 million bail and ordered that she surrender her passport and not to approach any of the witnesses.

=== Lawsuit by Global Royalty Trading SAL ===
On 26 June 2018, Global Royalty Trading SAL, a jewellery firm based in Lebanon, filed a suit against Rosmah over a jewellery consignment. It alleged that the jewellery delivered to Rosmah on 10 February 2018 were for her to evaluate and thereafter purchase those she selected, and to return the remaining. On 22 May 2018, Rosmah had acknowledged receipt of the jewellery but in her statement claims that the items were no longer with her as they had been seized by the authorities. Global Royalty said if the items were unrecoverable in full or in part, Rosmah would be held liable to pay the full cost.

Since the jewellery were confiscated as part of 1MDB investigation, the Malaysian government intervened in the lawsuit by a Lebanese jeweller against her. The case began hearing on 27 July 2018.

In its statement of claim, Global Royalty Trading SAL alleged that Rosmah was a long-standing customer and that it would send consignments of jewellery to her on her demand. The news created more resentment by Malaysians questioning how the wife of ex-Malaysian Prime Minister could afford to buy even one of the cheapest items on the list.

Then-Finance Minister Lim Guan Eng said that the delivery by Global Royalty Trading SAL of 44 pieces of jewellery linked to Rosmah were not declared to the Customs Department, as they should have been for any import of valuable goods into Malaysia. Undeclared imports were not permitted, and as a result, the jewellery could be seized.

On 25 May 2022, the High Court was told that Lebanese jewellery company Global Royalty Trading SAL and Rosmah were staking claim on a US$220,000 white gold diamond bracelet which was then stored in Bank Negara Malaysia vaults.

=== Claims by Adi Hasan AlFardan Jewellery ===
Adi Hasan AlFardan Jewellery, another high-end jeweller, requested the Malaysian police to return over US$5mil (MYR20.69mil) worth of seized jewellery which was delivered to Rosmah in March 2018. According to the Dubai-based company, the jewellery were handed to Rosmah but the payment had not been made. Adi AlFardan was also reported to be escorted by officers from the Prime Minister office to bypass Malaysian Customs and Immigration checks during his four visits to deliver the jewellery to Rosmah. According to the law firm hired by Adi Hasan AlFardan Jewellery, they waited for further instruction from their client before considering taking legal proceedings against Rosmah.

=== Sarawak school electricity project ===
In 2019, Rosmah was charged with corruption in relation to a project to provide solar hybrid power for rural schools in Sarawak. On 18 February 2021, Judge Mohamed Zaini Mazlan ruled that the prosecution had succeeded in establishing a prima facie case against Rosmah on all three charges of soliciting and receiving bribes and ordered Rosmah to enter her defence.

On 23 December 2021, the High Court disallowed the prosecution's move to impeach Rosmah over contradictions between her evidence in her current corruption trial and her statement as recorded by the Malaysian Anti-Corruption Commission during a money laundering investigation. Judge Mohamed Zaini Mazlan said Rosmah had attempted to explain the differences in court.

On 4 February 2022, Rosmah's bribery and corruption trial were further deferred as the final witness was unable to attend the court proceedings. On 15 February 2022, Rosmah’s lead lawyer Akberdin Abdul Kader tested positive for COVID-19, and two of her other defence counsels had close contact with him. As a result, the Kuala Lumpur High Court postponed to Feb 23 her corruption trial linked to a RM1.25 billion solar hybrid energy project.

On 1 September 2022, Rosmah was found guilty of three charges of corruption and sentenced to ten years' imprisonment, and fined RM970 million. She had pressured then Minister of Education, Mahdzir Khalid to award a contract to Jepak Holdings. Rosmah asked Jepak's owner to consult real estate developer Desmond Lim on how to receive the bribe.

Rosmah's sentencing took place merely a week after her husband Najib Razak started serving his 12-year sentence at Kajang Prison upon the loss of Najib's final appeal.

== Controversies and issues ==
=== Murder of Shaariibuugiin Altantuyaa ===
In a statutory declaration in his sedition trial in June 2008, Raja Petra said that he was "reliably informed" that Rosmah was one of three individuals who were present at the crime scene when Altantuyaa Shaariibuu was murdered on 19 October 2006. Dr Shaariibuu Setev, the father of Altantuyaa Shaariibuu, has asked the police to conduct a thorough investigation into an allegation by Raja Petra saying the police should look seriously into the allegations as it might provide them with fresh evidence in their case.

Raja Petra appeared to have distanced himself from the statutory declaration in a television interview with TV3, saying its accusations linking Najib and Rosmah to the murder were repeating information passed onto him by opposition figures, rather than information he knew to be true himself. He appeared to have stated that he did not genuinely believe that Rosmah was at the murder scene. The Malaysian Civil Liberties Movement alleged that the interview had been heavily edited and spin doctored in favour of Prime Minister Najib Razak just in time for the upcoming Sarawak state elections. Raja Petra also denied that he did not believe Rosmah was at the scene saying that the interview was "chopped up". He also later clarified and pointed out that he had always been consistent in relation to the statutory declaration, saying that he had never directly accused Rosmah of being at the scene of the murder, merely repeating what was told to him.

=== Comments on Japan's tsunami and earthquake ===
Rosmah's comment on Japan's quake-tsunami disaster:

Japan's earthquake and tsunami is a result of negligence in conducting environmental-friendly developments.

To me, this is a lesson to other countries, that in everything they do or in whatever development they plan, they should study the surrounding environment and connect it with climate change and green technology.

=== 'First Lady of Shopping' ===
Rosmah was alleged to be a compulsive shopper. In 2012, she was named the "first lady of shopping", for allegedly spending A$100,000 (RM325,000) at a Sydney boutique. The Malaysian Anti-Corruption Commission was called upon to investigate these allegations. In 2014, Rosmah purchased items amounting to $130,625 at a Chanel store in Honolulu, Hawaii. Rosmah and Najib were alleged to have spent more than $15 million of 1MDB money on luxury goods.

=== Passport return 2021 ===
On 15 October 2021, Rosmah was allowed to temporarily retake her passport so that she could travel to Singapore to visit her pregnant daughter who was then expected to give birth. Rosmah was expected to return her passport by 6 December and was to return to Malaysia by 21 November. However, when the date of her court hearing rolled around on 2 December, Rosmah did not show up in court, as she was still in Singapore. The youth wing of Malaysian political party Bersatu called for Rosmah's passport to be cancelled, and for her to be brought back into Malaysia immediately.

== Honours ==
=== Honours of Malaysia ===
- Kedah
  - Grand Commander of the Order of Loyalty to the Royal House of Kedah (SSDK) – Dato' Seri (2006)
- Kelantan
  - Grand Commander of the Order of the Life of the Crown of Kelantan (SJMK) – Dato' (2005)
  - Grand Commander of the Order of the Crown of Kelantan (SPMK) – Dato' (2010)
- Malacca
  - Grand Principal of the Premier and Exalted Order of Malacca (DUNM) -- Datuk Seri Utama (2010)
- Negeri Sembilan
  - Grand Commander of the Grand Order of Tuanku Jaafar (SPTJ) – Dato' Seri (2006, revoked 26 October 2018)
- Pahang
  - 2nd class of the Family Order of the Crown of Indra of Pahang (DK II) (2013)
  - Grand Companion of the Order of Sultan Ahmad Shah of Pahang (SSAP) – Dato' Sri (2004)
  - Grand Companion of the Order of the Crown of Pahang (SIMP) – formerly Dato', now Dato' Indera (2003)
- Sabah
  - Grand Commander of the Order of Kinabalu (SPDK) – Datuk Seri Panglima (2009)
- Sarawak
  - Grand Commander of the Order of the Star of Hornbill Sarawak (DA) – Datuk Amar (2010)
- Selangor
  - Grand Commander of the Order of the Crown of Selangor (SPMS) – Datin Paduka Seri (2005, suspended 6 May 2019 revoked 12 September 2022)

=== Honorary degrees ===
- Malaysia
  - Honorary Ph.D. degree in Education from Universiti Teknologi MARA (2009)
  - Honorary Ph.D. degree in Early Childhood Education from Universiti Pendidikan Sultan Idris (2012)
- Australia
  - Honorary Ph.D. degree from Curtin University (2012)

== See also ==
- 1MDB scandal
- Najib Razak controversies
- Corruption in Malaysia
