= Suhailah Noah =

Wife of the former Prime Minister of Malaysia (1931–2014)

Yang Amat Berbahagia Tun Dato' Seri Suhailah Mohamed Noah SSM SPMT
- سهيلة محمد نوح

Spouse of the Prime Minister of Malaysia
- In role 15 January 1976 – 16 July 1981
- Monarchs: Yahya Petra; Ahmad Shah
- Prime Minister: Hussein Onn
- Preceded by: Rahah Noah
- Succeeded by: Siti Hasmah Mohamad Ali

Spouse of the Deputy Prime Minister of Malaysia
- In role 13 August 1973 – 15 January 1976
- Monarchs: Abdul Halim; Yahya Petra
- Prime Minister: Abdul Razak Hussein
- Deputy: Hussein Onn
- Preceded by: Norashikin Mohd Seth
- Succeeded by: Siti Hasmah Mohamad Ali

Personal details
- Born: 26 October 1931 Muar, Johor, Unfederated Malay States, British Malaya (now Malaysia)
- Died: 4 October 2014 (aged 82) Damansara Utama, Petaling Jaya, Selangor
- Resting place: Makam Pahlawan, Masjid Negara, Kuala Lumpur
- Spouse: Hussein Onn (m. 1948; died 1990)
- Children: 6 (including Hishamuddin Hussein)
- Parent(s): Mohamed Noah Omar (father); Maimun Abdul Manaf (mother)
- Relatives: Rahah Noah (sister)

Suhailah binti Mohamed Noah (Jawi: سهيلة بنت محمد نوح; 26 October 1931 – 4 October 2014) was the widow of the 3rd Prime Minister of Malaysia Hussein Onn and the Spouse of the Prime Minister of Malaysia from 15 January 1976, until 16 July 1981. Hishammuddin Hussein, a Malaysian former Minister of Defence, is one of her and Onn's six children.

== Death ==
Suhaila Noah died on 4 October 2014, at 12:30 a.m. in Damansara Specialist Hospital in Damansara Utama, Petaling Jaya, Selangor, at the age of 82. She had outlived her husband by 24 years. Her funeral and burial was held at the Makam Pahlawan (Heroes Mausoleum) in Masjid Negara, Kuala Lumpur. She was buried near the grave of her husband, Hussein Onn (inside dome) and the grave of her father, Mohamed Noah Omar. Prior to her death, she resided in Bukit Tunku, Kuala Lumpur, at her family's residence in the Greater Kuala Lumpur area.

== Honours ==
=== Honours of Malaysia ===
- Malaysia
  - Grand Commander of the Order of Loyalty to the Crown of Malaysia (SSM) – Tun (1990)
- Terengganu
  - Knight Grand Commander of the Order of the Crown of Terengganu (SPMT) – Dato' Seri (1977)
