= Spouse of the prime minister of Malaysia =

Spouse of the head of government of Malaysia

Spouse of the Prime Minister of Malaysia
- Pasangan Perdana Menteri Malaysia
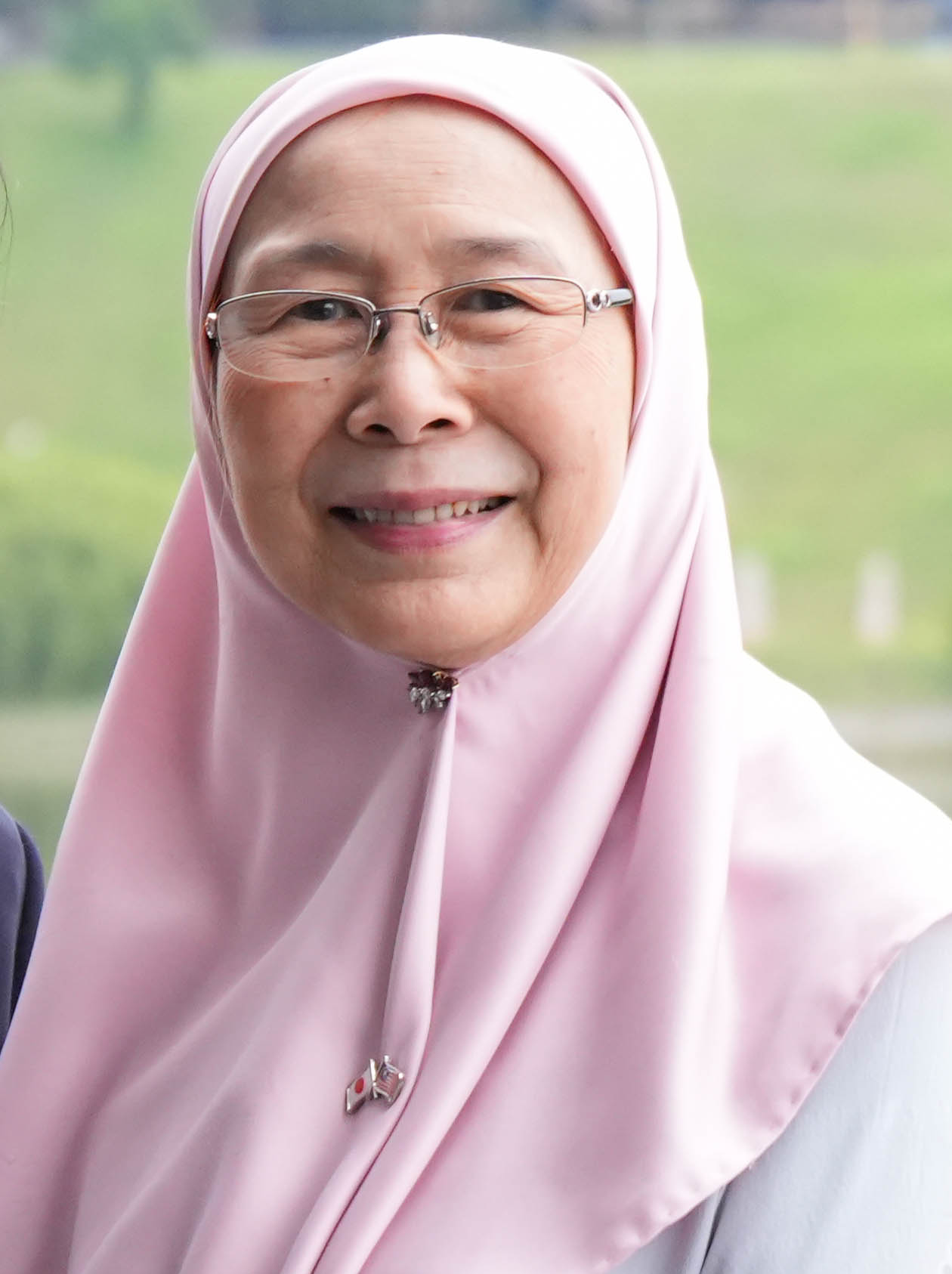
- Incumbent; Wan Azizah Wan Ismail since 24 November 2022
- Style: The Most Felicitous
- Residence: Seri Perdana
- Formation: 31 August 1957
- First holder: Sharifah Rodziah Syed Alwi Barakbah

The spouse of the prime minister of Malaysia (Malay: Pasangan Perdana Menteri Malaysia) refers to the spouse of the head of government of Malaysia, the prime minister. Since independence in 31 August 1957, the title has been held by women, therefore the spouse is also known as the prime minister's wife. Some commentators have tried to style prime ministers' wives as "First Lady of Malaysia", similar to the style of First Lady used in republics, but this is not a recognised title. To date, ten women have held the title of the spouse of the prime minister of Malaysia.

== Role of the spouse of the prime minister of Malaysia ==
The spouse of the prime minister of Malaysia is not an elected position, carries no official duties, and brings no salary. However, she does receive some allowance as recognition of her time and energy put into being the spouse of the prime minister of Malaysia.

As the spouse of the prime minister of Malaysia, she attends many official ceremonies and functions of state either along with or representing the prime minister.

The spouse of the prime minister of Malaysia frequently participates in humanitarian and charitable work. It became increasingly common for spouses of heads of state or government to select specific causes to promote, usually ones that are not politically divisive. It is common for the spouse of the prime minister of Malaysia to form organisations and hire staff to support these activities.

== List of spouses of prime ministers of Malaysia ==
#	Portrait	Spouse	Term start	Term end	Prime Minister (Coalition-Party)
1		Tun; Sharifah Rodziah Barakbah (1920–2000)	31 August 1957	22 September 1970	Tunku Abdul Rahman (Alliance–UMNO)
2		Tun; Rahah Mohammad Noah (1933–2020)	22 September 1970	14 January 1976	Abdul Razak Hussein (Alliance–UMNO) (1970–1973) (BN–UMNO) (1973–1976)
3		Tun; Suhaila Mohamed Noah (1931–2014)	15 January 1976	16 July 1981	Hussein Onn (BN–UMNO)
4		Tun Dr. Siti Hasmah Mohamad Ali (1926–2026)	16 July 1981	30 October 2003	Mahathir Mohamad (BN–UMNO)
5 (l)		Tun; Endon Mahmood Ambak (1940–2005)	31 October 2003	20 October 2005	Abdullah Ahmad Badawi (BN–UMNO)
5 (ll)		Tun; Jeanne Abdullah (born 1953)	9 June 2007	3 April 2009	Abdullah Ahmad Badawi (BN–UMNO)
6		Dato' Sri; Rosmah Mansor (born 1951)	3 April 2009	9 May 2018	Mohammad Najib Abdul Razak (BN–UMNO)
7		Tun Dr. Siti Hasmah Mohamad Ali (1926–2026)	10 May 2018	24 February 2020	Mahathir Mohamad (PH–BERSATU) (Interim Prime Minister from 24 February 2020 until 1 March 2020)
8		Puan Sri; Noorainee Abdul Rahman (born 1949)	1 March 2020	16 August 2021	Muhyiddin Yassin (PN–BERSATU) (Caretaker Prime Minister from 16 August 2021 until 21 August 2021)
9		Dato' Sri; Muhaini Zainal Abidin (born 1961)	21 August 2021	10 October 2022	Ismail Sabri Yaakob (BN–UMNO) (Caretaker Prime Minister from 10 October 2022 until 24 November 2022)
10		Dato' Sri Dr. Wan Azizah Wan Ismail; MP for Bandar Tun Razak (born 1952)	24 November 2022	Incumbent	Anwar Ibrahim (PH–PKR)

== List of spouses of prime ministers of Malaysia by age ==
#	Name	Born	Died	Age
1	Siti Hasmah Mohamad Ali	12 July 1926	28 September 2026	100 years, 78 days
2	Rahah Mohammad Noah	11 June 1933	18 December 2020	87 years, 190 days
3	Suhaila Mohamed Noah	26 October 1931	4 October 2014	82 years, 343 days
4	Sharifah Rodziah Syed Alwi Barakbah	1920	12 March 2000	79 years 71 days to 80 years, 70 days
5	Noorainee Abdul Rahman	21 April 1949	Alive	77 years, 177 days
6	Jeanne Abdullah	29 July 1953	Alive	73 years, 78 days
7	Rosmah Mansor	10 December 1951	Alive	74 years, 309 days
8	Endon Mahmood Ambak	24 December 1940	20 October 2005	64 years, 300 days
9	Muhaini Zainal Abidin	12 November 1961	Alive	64 years, 337 days
10	Wan Azizah Wan Ismail	3 December 1952	Alive	73 years, 316 days

== Controversy ==
=== Controversy over the usage of the title "First Lady" ===
The Yang di-Pertuan Agong (King of Malaysia) is a constitutional figurehead within the framework of a constitutional monarchy. It is argued that Article 32(2) of the Constitution of Malaysia stipulates that the Consort of the Yang di-Pertuan Agong takes precedence over all individuals in the federation and is second only to the Yang di-Pertuan Agong himself. Hence, it is argued that the Raja Permaisuri Agong is, by strict analogy only, the First Lady of Malaysia. It should however be borne in mind that such a title cannot exist in Malaysia in the first place, as "First Lady" exclusively refers to wives of presidents and not monarchs.

Before Najib's premiership, there had not been a precedent in Malaysia where someone other than the wife of the prime minister served as a self-styled "First Lady". While the Prime Minister Abdullah Ahmad Badawi's first late wife, Endon Mahmood underwent treatment for breast cancer in the United States, the title of "First Lady" was not officially designated.

The issue was brought up only during the premiership of Najib when his wife widely used the title of "First Lady". Many quarters either argue that it is reserved for the Raja Permaisuri Agong, or that it should never be used at all due to Malaysia not being a republic.

The issue didn't stop there as there was an obscure new unit established within the Prime Minister's Department with the acronym FLOM (which was not explained on the website, but taken to stand for "First Lady of Malaysia"). Datuk Siti Azizah binti Sheikh Abod was the Special Officer for the unit. The news on FLOM was widely covered by many bloggers with their own stories and analysis. This led to the government webpage containing the information of the contacts in FLOM department to be removed a few days after the story came out. However some search engines managed to store the cached version of the page. Many groups questioned the validity and functionality of the department. There were also some queries, especially in the Parliament of Malaysia, on how much allocation from the National Budget was allocated for the department.

== See also ==
- Spouse of the deputy prime minister of Malaysia
