= Spouse of the deputy prime minister of Malaysia =

- Incumbent; Hamidah Khamis; Ruziah Mohd Tahir since 3 December 2022
- Style: The Most Felicitous
- Residence: Sri Satria, Putrajaya
- Formation: 31 August 1957
- First holder: Rahah Noah

The spouse of the deputy prime minister of Malaysia refers to the wife or husband of the Deputy Prime Minister of Malaysia. To date, twelve women and one man have held the title of the spouse of the deputy prime minister of Malaysia.

== List of spouses of deputy prime ministers of Malaysia ==
#	Portrait	Spouse (Birth-Death)	Term start	Term end	Deputy Prime Minister (Party)
1		Tun; Rahah Mohamed Noah (1933–2020)	31 August 1957	22 September 1970	Abdul Razak Hussein (Alliance–UMNO)
2		Toh Puan; Norashikin Mohd Seth (1932–2010)	22 September 1970	2 August 1973	Ismail Abdul Rahman (Alliance–UMNO)
3		Tun; Suhailah Mohamed Noah (1930–2014)	13 August 1973	15 January 1976	Hussein Onn (Alliance–UMNO) (1970–1973) (BN–UMNO) (1973–1976)
4		Tun Dr. Siti Hasmah Mohamad Ali (1926–2026)	5 March 1976	16 July 1981	Mahathir Mohamad (BN–UMNO)
5		Toh Puan; Ines Maria Reyna (born unknown)	18 July 1981	16 March 1986	Musa Hitam (BN–UMNO)
6		Toh Puan; Asmah Alang (1927–2004)	10 May 1986	15 October 1993	Abdul Ghafar Baba (BN–UMNO)
7		Toh Puan; Dayang Heryati Abdul Rahim (born 1961)	1992	15 October 1993	Abdul Ghafar Baba (BN–UMNO)
8		Dato' Seri Dr. Wan Azizah Wan Ismail (born 1952)	1 December 1993	2 September 1998	Anwar Ibrahim (BN–UMNO)
9		Tun; Endon Mahmood Ambak (1940–2005)	8 January 1999	31 October 2003	Abdullah Ahmad Badawi (BN–UMNO)
10		Dato' Sri; Rosmah Mansor (born 1951)	7 January 2004	3 April 2009	Mohammad Najib Abdul Razak (BN–UMNO)
11		Puan Sri; Noorainee Abdul Rahman (born 1949)	10 April 2009	28 July 2015	Muhyiddin Yassin (BN–UMNO)
12		Dato' Sri; Hamidah Khamis (born 1955)	29 July 2015	9 May 2018	Ahmad Zahid Hamidi (BN–UMNO)
13		Dato' Seri; Anwar Ibrahim (born 1947); MP for Port Dickson	21 May 2018	24 February 2020	Wan Azizah Wan Ismail (PH–PKR)
14		Dato' Sri; Muhaini Zainal Abidin (born 1962)	7 July 2021	16 August 2021	Ismail Sabri Yaakob (BN–UMNO)
15		Dato' Sri; Hamidah Khamis (born 1955)	3 December 2022	Incumbent	Ahmad Zahid Hamidi (BN–UMNO)
15		Datin Sri; Ruziah Mohd Tahir (born unknown)	3 December 2022	Incumbent	Fadillah Yusof (GPS–PBB)

== See also ==
- Spouse of the prime minister of Malaysia
