= Muhaini Zainal Abidin =

Spouse & wife of Ismail Sabri Yaakob

Yang Hormat Dato' Sri Muhaini Zainal Abidin SSAP
- مهيني زين العابدين

Spouse of the Prime Minister of Malaysia
- In role 21 August 2021 – 10 October 2022; Spouse of the Caretaker: 10 October – 24 November 2022
- Monarch: Abdullah
- Prime Minister: Ismail Sabri Yaakob
- Preceded by: Noorainee Abdul Rahman
- Succeeded by: Wan Azizah Wan Ismail

Spouse of the Deputy Prime Minister of Malaysia
- In role 7 July 2021 – 16 August 2021
- Monarch: Abdullah
- Deputy Prime Minister: Ismail Sabri Yaakob
- Preceded by: Anwar Ibrahim
- Succeeded by: Hamidah Khamis; Ruziah Mohd Tahir

Personal details
- Born: Muhaini binti Zainal Abidin; 12 November 1961 (age 64)
- Spouse: Ismail Sabri Yaakob (m. 1986)
- Children: 4

Muhaini binti Zainal Abidin (Jawi: مهيني بنت زين العابدين; born 12 November 1961) is a Malaysian who is the wife of Dato' Sri Ismail Sabri Yaakob, the 9th Prime Minister of Malaysia from August 2021 to October 2022 and 13th Deputy Prime Minister of Malaysia from July 2021 to August 2021.

== Personal life ==
In 1979, Muhaini became friends with Ismail Sabri Yaakob, who was 18 at the time. She married him in 1986. They had four children – three sons and one daughter.

One of her sons, Dafi (born Gadaffi bin Ismail Sabri), was a participant in the fifth season of reality program Akademi Fantasia in 2007. Her only daughter, Nina Sabrina, has married a fashion designer named Jovian Mandagie, but divorced in August 2023.

== Honours ==
- Pahang
  - Knight Grand Companion of the Order of Sultan Ahmad Shah of Pahang (SSAP) – Dato' Sri (2015)
