= Hamidah Khamis =

Spouse of the Deputy Prime Minister of Malaysia

Yang Amat Berbahagia Dato' Sri Hamidah Khamis SSAP DMSM
- حميدة خميس

Spouse of the Deputy Prime Minister of Malaysia
- Incumbent
- Assumed role 3 December 2022 Serving with Ruziah Mohd Tahir
- Deputy Prime Minister: Ahmad Zahid Hamidi
- Preceded by: Muhaini Zainal Abidin
- In office 29 July 2015 – 9 May 2018
- Preceded by: Noorainee Abdul Rahman
- Succeeded by: Anwar Ibrahim

Personal details
- Born: Hamidah binti Khamis; 31 October 1955 (age 70) Perak, Federation of Malaya (now Malaysia)
- Citizenship: Malaysian
- Spouse: Ahmad Zahid Hamidi
- Children: 5

Hamidah binti Khamis (born 31 October 1955) is the spouse and wife of Ahmad Zahid Hamidi, the 9th President of United Malays National Organisation (UMNO) since 2018, 14th Deputy Prime Minister of Malaysia since 3 December 2022 and 11th Deputy Prime Minister of Malaysia from July 2015 to May 2018.

== Marriage ==
She was married to Dato' Seri Ahmad Zahid Hamidi and issued with 5 children, 3 son and 2 daughter.

== Honours ==
- Malacca
  - Companion of the Exalted Order of Malacca (DMSM) – Datuk (2013)
- Pahang
  - Knight Grand Companion of the Order of Sultan Ahmad Shah of Pahang (SSAP) – Dato' Sri (2014)
