= Siti Hasmah =

Malaysian physician and civil servant (1926–2026)

Yang Amat Berbahagia Tun Siti Hasmah SSM SSDK SPDK DUPN DUNM DA SMK KMN PCK
- حسمه محمد علي
- Siti Hasmah in 2019

Spouse of the Prime Minister of Malaysia
- In role 10 May 2018 – 24 February 2020; Spouse of the Interim Prime Minister of Malaysia: 24 February – 1 March 2020
- Monarchs: Muhammad V; Abdullah
- Prime Minister: Mahathir Mohamad
- Preceded by: Rosmah Mansor
- Succeeded by: Noorainee Abdul Rahman
- In role 16 July 1981 – 31 October 2003
- Monarchs: Ahmad Shah; Iskandar; Azlan Shah; Jaafar; Salahuddin; Sirajuddin
- Prime Minister: Mahathir Mohamad
- Preceded by: Suhailah Noah
- Succeeded by: Endon Mahmood

Spouse of the Deputy Prime Minister of Malaysia
- In role 5 March 1976 – 16 July 1981
- Deputy Prime Minister: Mahathir Mohamad
- Preceded by: Suhailah Noah
- Succeeded by: Ines Maria Reyna

Personal details
- Born: Hasmah binti Mohamad Ali; 12 July 1926 Klang, Selangor, Federated Malay States
- Died: 28 September 2026 (aged 100) Kuala Lumpur, Malaysia
- Resting place: Pusara Negarawan, Putrajaya, Malaysia
- Spouse: Mahathir Mohamad (m. 1956)
- Children: 7 (including Marina, Mokhzani and Mukhriz)
- Relatives: Ismail Ali (brother); Hashim Ali (brother); Razali Ali (brother); Saleha Ali (sister)
- Education: King Edward VII College of Medicine (MBBS)
- Occupation: Physician; civil servant
- Awards: Full list

Hasmah binti Mohamad Ali (Note: Jawi: حسمه بنت محمد علي) (12 July 1926 – 28 September 2026), better known as Siti Hasmah, (Note: She uses "Siti" as a nickname. In an interview, she explained that because "Siti" was trendy in the 1970s, people simply added it to her name.) was a Malaysian physician and public health advocate who served as the spouse of the prime minister of Malaysia from 1981 to 2003 and again from 2018 to 2020, as the wife of Mahathir Mohamad, the fourth and seventh prime minister of Malaysia. She was the spouse of the deputy prime minister from 1976 to 1981 when her husband was the deputy prime minister.

Born in Klang, Selangor, Siti Hasmah graduated from King Edward VII College of Medicine in 1955 and joined the government health service. She became one of the first Malay women to enter the medical profession and achieved several milestones in public health, including becoming the first woman appointed a medical officer in the Maternal and Child Health Department in 1965 and the first woman appointed State Maternal and Child Health Officer in 1974. Her work in Kedah included maternal and child healthcare, and she contributed to medical education and research on family medicine and women's health.

After marrying Mahathir on 5 August 1956, Siti Hasmah continued her medical career while raising their seven children. During her husband's premiership, she used her public role to promote maternal and child health, family planning, drug abuse prevention, rural women's development and adult literacy. She also participated in international initiatives on drug abuse, rural women's economic advancement and mental health, and supported charitable, educational and community organisations. In 1995, she led the Malaysian delegation to the United Nations Fourth World Conference on Women in Beijing, while her other public initiatives included promoting awareness of the effects of war on children.

After Mahathir left office in 2003, Siti Hasmah continued to participate in public life, including women's advocacy, healthcare awareness, education, badminton and cultural activities. She remained involved in public health discussions in her later years, including encouraging COVID-19 vaccination during the pandemic, and continued playing the violin at public events into her centenarian years. In recognition of her contributions to Malaysian society, she was given the title Ibu Negara (Mother of the Nation) by the Asian Strategy and Leadership Institute in 2019. She died at the age of 100 on 28 September 2026 and was accorded a state funeral before being laid to rest at Pusara Negarawan in Putrajaya.

== Early life and education ==
Siti Hasmah was born in Klang, Selangor, into a family of ten children. Her father, Haji Mohammed Ali Talib, worked with the Public Services Commission and dealt with bankruptcy cases as an official assignee and public trustee. When she was three years old, her family moved to Kuala Lumpur.

In December 1941, Siti Hasmah had just sat for her Senior Cambridge examinations when Japan began bombing Malaya. During the Japanese occupation, she learned to cook and play the violin, and she and her sisters performed on the radio as the “Ali Sisters”. Although she had initially aspired to become a journalist, her exposure to widespread illness and disease during the occupation led her to pursue a career in medicine.

After completing her schooling at St. Mary's School, Kuala Lumpur, she enrolled in the medical programme at the King Edward VII College of Medicine in Singapore (now the NUS Yong Loo Lin School of Medicine) which later merged with Raffles College to become the University of Malaya. She was one of the first Malay women to enroll, and the only one in her entire cohort. Recalling her student days, Siti Hasmah said that she feared examinations and had to repeat examination papers every six months. While studying at KEVII College, Siti Hasmah also played field hockey. In October 1947, she was named the outstanding female player in a mixed hockey match, helping the Biologists defeat the Anatomists 1–0.

== Medical career ==
After earning her MBBS from the University of Malaya (Singapore) in 1955, she joined the government health service. She was one of the first Malay female doctors in the then-Malaya.

Siti Hasmah achieved several firsts at the Ministry of Health, including being the first woman in Malaysia to serve as a medical officer in the Maternal and Child Health Department in 1965. In 1966, she attended a public health certificate programme at the University of Michigan School of Public Health.

In 1974, she was the first woman to be appointed State Maternal and Child Health Officer in Kedah. During her tenure, Siti Hasmah successfully reduced the infant mortality rate from 75 per 1,000 to only 6 per 1,000.

She was also the author of several articles on family medicine and the socioeconomic factors associated with pregnancy and childbearing in Malaysia. Additionally, Siti Hasmah once served as a lecturer at the Faculty of Dentistry at the University of Malaya.

== Spouse of the Deputy Prime Minister of Malaysia (1976–1981) ==
During Mahathir's tenure as deputy prime minister, Siti Hasmah continued her medical career. She worked as a medical officer of health in the Maternal and Child Health Department at the Institute of Public Health before retiring from government service in 1979. She subsequently lectured at the Faculty of Dentistry at the University of Malaya until 1981.

In addition to her medical and academic work, Siti Hasmah published writings on maternal and child health, women's health and traditional medical practices. Her publications during this period included Susuan Ibu & Penyusuan Anak (1976), The Socio-economic & Cultural Factors Associated with Pregnancy, Childbirth and Puerperium in Malaysia (1976), Rokok Punca Kecacatan Anak (1978), Adat, Kesihatan dan Wanita (1979), and Traditional Practices & Modern Medicine in Kedah, published in the book Darulaman (1979). These works addressed subjects including breastfeeding, the social and cultural factors associated with pregnancy and childbirth, smoking-related risks to children, and traditional health practices.

In December 1976, she hosted a tea party at the deputy prime minister's residence in Kuala Lumpur for Kwa Geok Choo, the wife of Singaporean Prime Minister Lee Kuan Yew. During the gathering, Kwa presented her with a Singapore-made orchid plated with 22-carat gold. The guests included the wives of Malaysian government officials and the wife of Singapore's high commissioner to Malaysia.

In 1977, Siti Hasmah became involved in the development of BAKTI (Badan Amal Kebajikan & Tenaga Isteri-Isteri), a welfare organisation for the wives of ministers and deputy ministers. Its establishment to organise a fundraising funfair for orphans, people with disabilities and others in need. Siti Hasmah helped draft the organisation's constitution and structure; under its rules, the wife of the deputy prime minister served as deputy president. BAKTI subsequently organised other fundraising activities, including a cultural event with a Sumatran troupe and a charity screening of Star Wars in 1980.

In 1979, she also became president of the Persatuan Pemulihan Orang Cacat Wilayah Persekutuan dan Selangor (Association for the Rehabilitation of Disabled Persons of the Federal Territory and Selangor), an organisation concerned with the rehabilitation of people with disabilities.

From 1979 to 1987, Siti Hasmah served as vice-president of the Malaysian Association for the Blind, supporting its programmes for blind people and its fundraising campaigns. She also chaired charity banquets for the association, including events held in 1978 and 1980.

== First term as spouse of the Prime Minister of Malaysia (1981–2003) ==
Siti Hasmah served as the spouse of the 4th Prime Minister of Malaysia from 16 July 1981, to 31 October 2003. She was the first wife of a Malaysian prime minister to have a professional career, being a qualified physician. During a visit to Singapore in December 1981, an orchid was named after her, Dendrobium Siti Hasmah, in recognition of her interest in orchids. In October 1983, a robot named DM2SHO, after Siti Hasmah and Mahathir, greeted the couple at the opening of Malaysia's first Electrical Science Museum at Universiti Teknologi Malaysia in Kuala Lumpur.

She used her position as the wife of the prime minister to advocate for women's health, family planning, drug abuse control, and adult literacy. She also served in various positions as follows:

- President of the Malaysian Girl Guides Association
- Chairman of the Kedah Family Planning Association
- President of the Malaysian Medical Association Foundation
- President of the Association for the Rehabilitation of Handicapped Children
- Vice-President of the Federation of Family Planning Associations of Malaysia
- Patron of the Malaysian Association of Maternal Health and Neonate
- Patron of the Malaysian Pediatric Association
- Patron of the Badminton Association of Malaysia

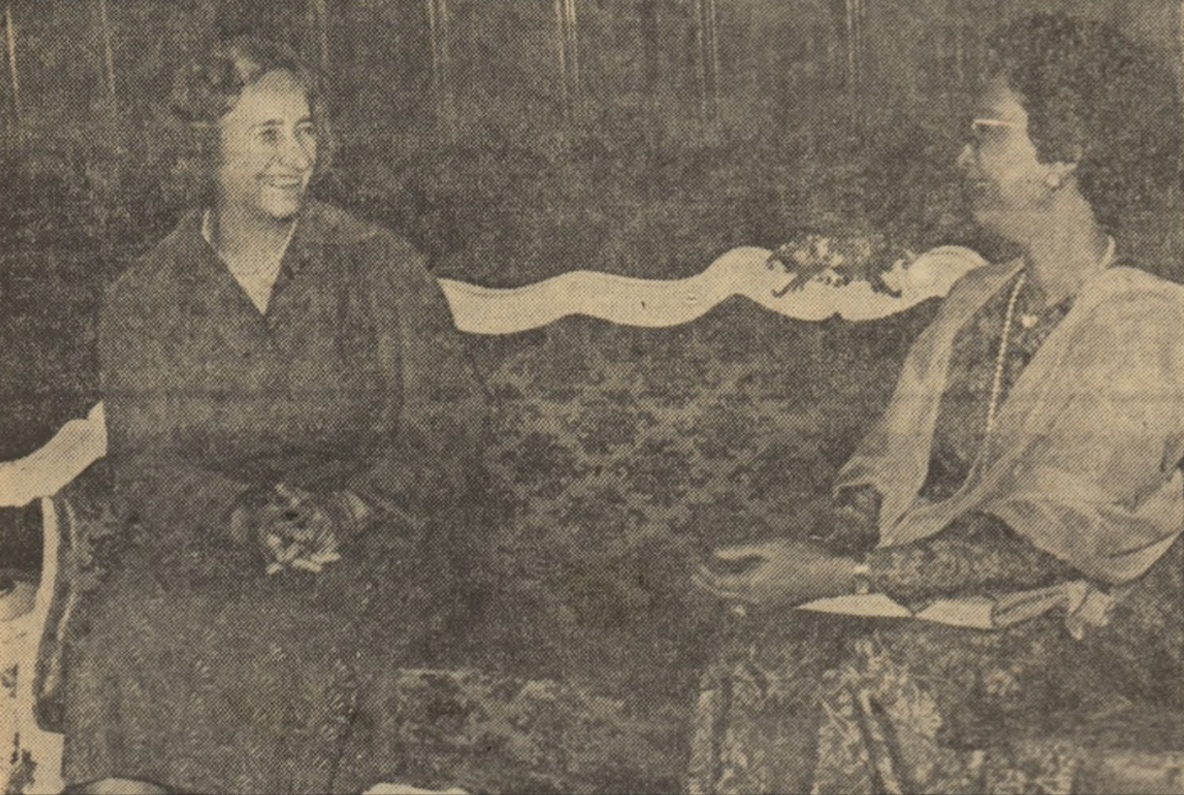
Siti Hasmah (right) with Elena Ceaușescu (left), the wife of Romanian head of state Nicolae Ceaușescu, during Elena's visit to Malaysia in 1982.

As Patron of the Pan Pacific South Asia Women's Association, (PPSEAWA) Malaysia, Siti Hasmah attended and presented keynote addresses at the Triennial Conferences in Tokyo (1984), Bangkok (1991) and Tonga (1994). She also served as the first chancellor of Multimedia University for 15 years, from 1997 to 2012.

Siti Hasmah played a key role in bringing Malaysia and its women into the international spotlight. She met and held discussions with prominent figures, including Nancy Reagan, wife of U.S. President Ronald Reagan; Rosalynn Carter, wife of U.S. President Jimmy Carter; Queen Fabiola of Belgium; Queen Noor of Jordan; Queen Elizabeth II of the United Kingdom; and Cherie Blair, wife of British Prime Minister Tony Blair, the last of whom she had once engaged with in diplomatic conversations.

Siti Hasmah also promoted a micro-credit scheme to help rural women overcome poverty, drawing on a programme she had learned about in Bangladesh. In a 1997 interview, she said that the scheme provided interest-free loans to eligible women and had benefited 46,000 women by that time.

In September 1995, Siti Hasmah led the Malaysian delegation to the United Nations Fourth World Conference on Women in Beijing, where she delivered a speech titled "Equality, Development and Peace: A Caring World". During the conference, Siti Hasmah received a UNIFEM Anniversary Award in recognition of her work for women.

In August 1999, a man attempted to ram a government vehicle carrying Siti Hasmah, but was intercepted by security personnel and eventually apprehended.

In March 2000, Siti Hasmah led a Malaysian delegation on a five-day goodwill visit to Iraq to assess the impact of economic sanctions on women and children. The delegation visited hospitals, orphanages, and old folks' homes, bringing essential medical supplies. It also met Iraqi Vice-President Taha Yassin Ramadan and attended a briefing by outgoing UN Humanitarian Coordinator for Iraq Hans-Christof von Sponeck. During the trip, Siti Hasmah met Iraqi Deputy Prime Minister Tariq Aziz and was later invited for a brief meeting with Iraqi President Saddam Hussein. She later recalled that the meeting was kept secret until it occurred, even from her security team and Mahathir, and that during their conversation, Saddam expressed gratitude to Malaysia for its support in efforts to lift the sanctions. Mahathir defended the visit by saying that Siti Hasmah had gone to express sympathy for the Iraqi people rather than help Saddam, while reiterating Malaysia's opposition to Iraq's invasion of Kuwait and criticising the superpowers' treatment of Iraq.

In October 2003, before her tenure as the wife of the prime minister ended, Siti Hasmah chaired the First Ladies Dialogue on "Women, Peace, and Development" during the 10th Organisation of Islamic Cooperation Summit. The dialogue focused on women's roles in nation-building, and a 10-point resolution was submitted to promote sustainable development and gender equity.

== Second term as spouse of the Prime Minister of Malaysia (2018–2020) ==
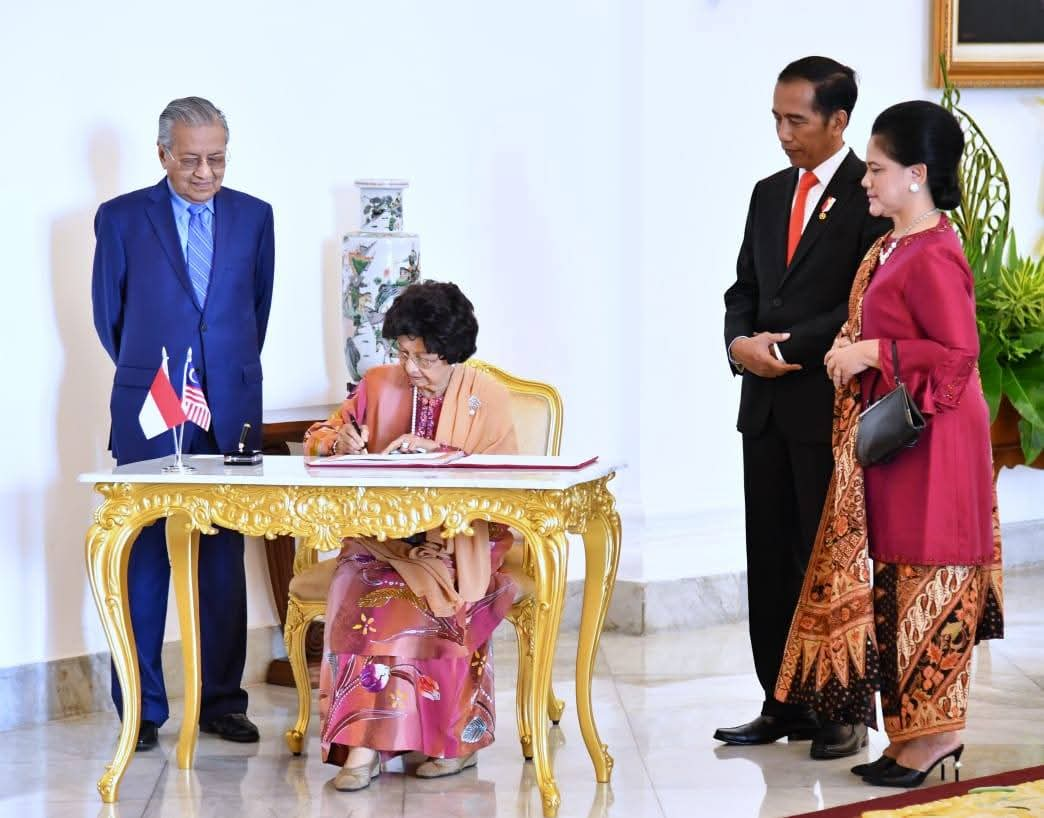
In 2018, Siti Hasmah accompanied Mahathir on his visit to Indonesia and met with Indonesian President Joko Widodo and his wife Iriana

Siti Hasmah again served as the wife of the prime minister after her husband was reappointed on 10 May 2018. Later in November of that same year, she launched Malaysia's first 24-hour bookstore, BookXcess Cyberjaya, where she signed a plaque inscribed with the words: 'A book warrior and a true believer in the power of reading'. Around the same time, a video of Siti Hasmah asking Pakistani Prime Minister Imran Khan if she could hold his hand went viral, with commentators describing the moment as refreshing and surpassing conventional diplomacy.

In April 2019, Siti Hasmah launched the Sinar KASIH programme, urging society to support students with chronic illnesses and disabilities, emphasising their right to education and the opportunity to pursue their ambitions. In July, she became patron of the Save Our Malayan Tiger campaign and called on Malaysians to help conserve the endangered species. In December, Siti Hasmah launched seven medical and health books published by the National Language and Literature Agency to promote public access to health information in Malay. Two days later, she launched an influenza vaccination campaign, encouraging Malaysians to protect themselves and their families through preventive healthcare.

During her second term as the spouse of the prime minister, Siti Hasmah visited firefighter Muhammad Adib Mohd Kassim at the National Heart Institute in Kuala Lumpur, where he was receiving treatment for critical injuries sustained during the Seafield Sri Maha Mariamman Temple riots in Subang Jaya. She also visited Japanese badminton player Kento Momota and other passengers at Putrajaya Hospital following a road accident on the Maju Expressway that killed their van driver and injured the occupants.

== Later life ==
=== 2003–2018 ===
After 2003, Siti Hasmah continued to contribute to charitable, educational, health and community organisations outside her formal role as the prime minister's spouse. She also served as patron of the Badminton Association of Malaysia for more than two decades, until 2007, and as patron of Wheelchair Tennis Malaysia for more than two decades, until 2018.

Siti Hasmah followed Mahathir and resigned from the United Malays National Organisation (UMNO) on 19 May 2008. Mahathir quit the party after losing confidence in the leadership of his handpicked successor and then-Prime Minister, Abdullah Ahmad Badawi. Both of them later rejoined UMNO in April 2009. However, history repeated itself in February 2016 when they both quit UMNO for a second time in protest against Najib's leadership.

In December 2014, the Women's Institute of Management, of which she was an honorary life member, named a VIP lounge at its Kuala Lumpur headquarters in her honour. At the opening ceremony, she performed on the violin alongside music teacher Winnie Cheah and her pupils.

In July 2015, Siti Hasmah discussed the role of a prime minister's spouse in an interview with Malaysiakini. She described the position as an unofficial intermediary between the public and the head of government, while emphasising that a prime minister's spouse should not promise government decisions or contracts. She also stated that she had been a member of the United Malays National Organisation (UMNO) but had never held a party position.

On 29 August 2015, Siti Hasmah attended the Bersih 4 rally at Dataran Merdeka in Kuala Lumpur. She described the demonstration as a display of "people's power" and called on Malaysians to remain united despite their political differences, while cautioning against violence.

In December 2015, she launched the book Women Leaders in Malaysian Academia – Women Chancellors, Pro-Chancellors & Vice-Chancellors of Malaysian Universities 1957–Present, which documented women who had held senior leadership positions at Malaysian universities. During the event, she discussed the changing participation of Malay women in higher education.

In July 2016, around her 90th birthday, Siti Hasmah spoke to Malay Mail about her experiences in rural healthcare and expressed the hope that the lessons she had learnt would guide younger doctors considering work in rural areas. She also emphasised the importance of remaining active after retirement.

In September 2017, Siti Hasmah spoke at the Purple Walk, a women's rally in Kuala Lumpur against what its organisers described as "toxic politics". Addressing around 1,000 women who participated in the march, she urged them to oppose injustice against women, political violence, threats, racism, sexism, hate speech, abuse of the law and disregard for the Federal Constitution.

On 11 April 2018, Siti Hasmah performed two songs on the violin at a fundraising concert in Putrajaya organised in support of Mahathir and Pakatan Harapan ahead of the 2018 Malaysian general election. Her violin, which she had autographed, was subsequently sold at auction for RM35,000.

=== 2020–2026 ===
After Mahathir's second premiership ended in 2020, Siti Hasmah continued to speak publicly on healthcare issues. In March 2021, she received her first dose of a COVID-19 vaccine and said she hoped to encourage other senior citizens to get vaccinated. In May, she urged the government to make vaccination compulsory and called for the national immunisation programme to be extended to villages. Later that year, UNICEF featured her in its UNICEF75 Wisdom Project, in which she discussed her experiences in maternal and child healthcare and rural medicine, and expressed concern about misinformation surrounding vaccination during the COVID-19 pandemic.

She also continued to participate in educational and cultural activities at Multimedia University (MMU). In March 2022, she visited its Cyberjaya campus, where she met students and alumni and played the violin with students. In June that year, she performed three pieces at the launch of the MMU Siti Hasmah Symphony Orchestra, a student orchestra named after her, as part of the university's 25th-anniversary celebrations. In October, she participated in an MMU talk show alongside former and current university leaders, discussing the institution's development.

On 12 July 2026, Siti Hasmah turned 100 and by the following month, she was recognized as the Oldest Living Spouse of a Former Prime Minister by the ASEAN Records. On 23 September, five days before her death, Siti Hasmah performed at MMU's Beyond the Stage 2026. Three days before her death, she met politician Syed Saddiq and his fiancée, Bella Astillah, and expressed her eagerness to attend their wedding, which she did not live to see.

== Death ==
Siti Hasmah laid to rest at Putrajaya

It was announced that Siti Hasmah had died at 09:20 local time (UTC+08:00), 28 September 2026, from heart failure at the National Heart Institute in Kuala Lumpur. Her death was confirmed by her son, Mokhzani, to Bernama the same day.

Tributes were offered by the incumbent king of Malaysia Ibrahim Iskandar and queen consort Raja Zarith Sofiah, alongside political figures Syed Saddiq, Wan Azizah Wan Ismail and the incumbent prime minister Anwar Ibrahim. Siti Hasmah's remains were brought to her residence in Seri Kembangan before being transported to As-Syarif Mosque where she was washed and given funeral prayers. In a statement, Anwar highlighted that "the nation will continue to remember her motherly figure and appreciate her contributions and services", and later announced that Hasmah would be conferred a state funeral. Following her death, Communications Minister Fahmi Fadzil urged television and radio stations to moderate and adjust their programming throughout the day as a mark of respect for her contributions to the country. Health Minister Dzulkefly Ahmad paid tribute to Siti Hasmah's contributions to public health, particularly in maternal and child healthcare, family health and social welfare. The Badminton Association of Malaysia also mourned her death, recalling her more than two decades as its patron. Former national badminton player Razif Sidek, captain of Malaysia's 1992 Thomas Cup-winning team, remembered her as a mother figure to the players, recalling how she visited training sessions and encouraged them. Former national badminton player Lee Chong Wei recalled that Siti Hasmah had encouraged athletes after defeats as well as congratulated them on victories.

Outside of Malaysia, foreign dignitaries Lawrence Wong, Lee Hsien Loong, Goh Chok Tong, and Halimah Yacob paid tribute to Siti Hasmah as the The Straits Times highlighted her "pioneering contributions to public healthcare and education". Meanwhile, the circulation of social media videos allegedly manipulated using artificial intelligence (AI) to alter footage of Mahathir mourning her death drew public criticism, prompting the Malaysian Communications and Multimedia Commission (MCMC) to review the content on 2 October and warn that legal action could be taken if violations were found.

Hours after her death at 18:20 local time, Siti Hasmah was buried at Pusara Negara in Putrajaya. According to a report published on 12 October, approximately 21,000 people had visited her grave during the first 13 days after her burial, according to an estimate by a cemetery supervisor from the Putrajaya Corporation. Mahathir later publicly thanked members of the public for their continued prayers and those who had assisted with her funeral arrangements, while apologising to those whose messages of condolence he had been unable to acknowledge in a statement shared on Facebook on 19 October.

== Advocacy ==
=== Drug abuse ===
Siti Hasmah in 2019

As the President of BAKTI (Welfare Club of the Wives of Ministers and Deputy Ministers), Siti Hasmah actively participated in initiatives to raise awareness among young people about the dangers of drug abuse. In 1985, she accepted an invitation from United States First Lady Nancy Reagan to attend the First Ladies' Conference on Drug Abuse in Washington D.C..

Two years later, in 1987, she represented Malaysia at the International Conference on Drug Abuse and Illicit Trafficking in Vienna.

=== Rural women ===
Siti Hasmah was also active internationally in promoting the cause of rural women. In 1992, at the invitation of Queen Fabiola of Belgium, she attended the First Ladies Summit for the Economic Advancement of Rural Women in Geneva. She was chosen as one of the six Core-Group Initiators of First Ladies representing the Asia-Pacific Region.

In February 1994, Siti Hasmah participated in the ISC Council Meeting held in Brussels. The following year, in September 1995, she was named Chairperson of the Regional Steering Committee on the Economic Advancement of Rural and Island Women for the Asia-Pacific region. By November 1996, she had assumed the role of president.

=== Mental health ===
Being a medical doctor by training, Siti Hasmah also had an interest in mental health. Former First Lady of the United States, Rosalynn Carter invited Siti Hasmah to serve on the National Committee of the World Federation of Mental Health which Carter chaired.

=== Peace advocacy ===
Siti Hasmah also advocated peaceful conflict resolution and public awareness of the effects of war. In a speech titled "Invest in Peace, Say No to War" at the Malaysian Women's Convention in February 2003, she highlighted the consequences of armed conflict for civilians, particularly women and children, and called for peaceful approaches to resolving international disputes.

In 2012, Siti Hasmah founded the Criminalise War Club, an initiative aimed at educating schoolchildren about the destructive effects of war, particularly on children. The initiative encouraged students to organise awareness activities in schools, with guidance from the Kuala Lumpur Foundation to Criminalise War.

== Personal life ==
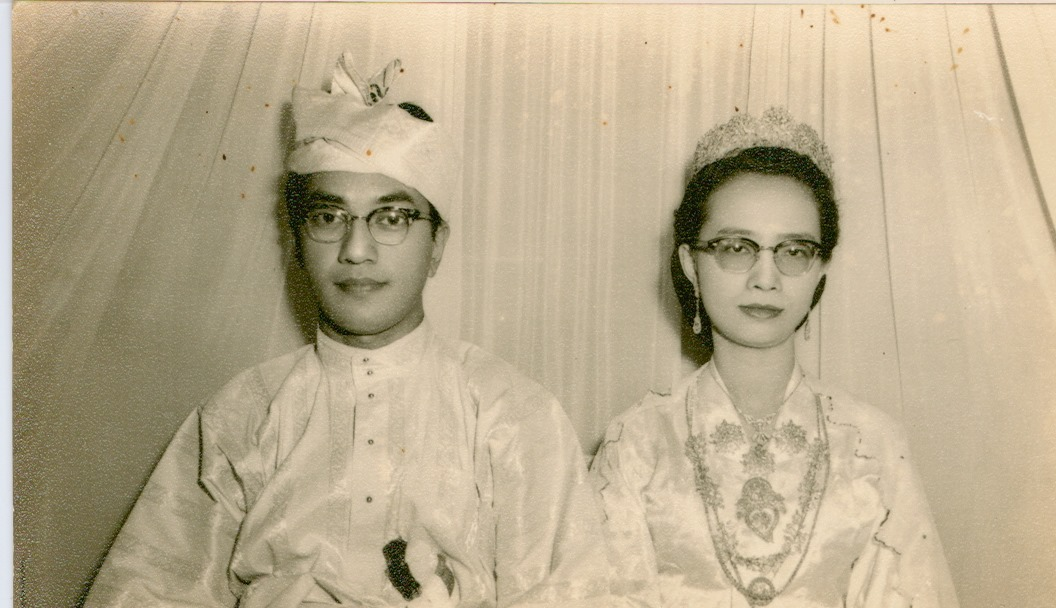
Siti Hasmah and Mahathir after they were married in August 1956

A photo taken in front of a car in 1929. From left: Uncle Ahmad, Ismail (older brother), Kalsom, Siti Hasmah, Maimon, Jameah (older sister), and Hj. Mohd. Ali (father).

On 5 August 1956, Siti Hasmah married Mahathir. They had seven children: Marina, Mirzan, Melinda, Mokhzani, Mukhriz, Maizura, and Mazhar. They met as students while studying at the King Edward VII College of Medicine in Singapore in 1947, and began their relationship on 23 April 1949. Their son Mukhriz served twice as the Menteri Besar of Kedah, from 2013 to 2016 and again from 2018 to 2020. Their eldest daughter Marina is a social activist and writer known for her advocacy on HIV/AIDS awareness, women's rights and human rights. She served as president of the Malaysian AIDS Council and was recognised for her work in social and political activism. Their son Mokhzani is a Malaysian businessman and petroleum engineer who began his career as a wellsite operations engineer with Sarawak Shell Berhad in 1987 before entering the corporate sector, later founding Kencana Petroleum and serving as chairman of the Sepang International Circuit from 2003 to 2016.

Most of Siti Hasmah's siblings held prominent roles in economics, military, and politics within the country; her brother Ismail Mohamed Ali was the second Governor of the Central Bank of Malaysia, her brother Mohamed Hashim Mohd Ali was the ninth Chief of the Malaysian Defence Forces, and her brother Ahmad Razali Mohd Ali was the eleventh Menteri Besar of Selangor. Her elder sister, Saleha Mohd Ali, was also involved in political activities associated with the United Malays National Organisation (UMNO). Her younger brother, Jaffar Mohamed Ali, was an advertising industry executive who served as executive chairman of the Institute of Advertising Communication Training and president of the Malaysian Advertisers Association, and received an achievement award from the Malaysian Association of Advertising Film Makers in 1999 in recognition of his contributions to the industry.

In Siti Hasmah's 2016 memoir, My Name is Hasmah, she described Mahathir as her 'hero' who supported her throughout her studies, particularly when she struggled with physics and chemistry. She also referred to Mahathir as her 'boy from the Paddy Fields State', a nickname referring to his Kedah origins.

Siti Hasmah was a cat lover and music enthusiast. She began learning the violin at 16 but stopped after a few years; she resumed playing more than 70 years later. In 2018, her violin was auctioned for RM35,000 to support Pakatan Harapan's campaign for the 2018 general election. In her seventies she dedicated herself to learning French and successfully passed the examinations. In December 2015, Siti Hasmah learned to play a new instrument, the erhu.

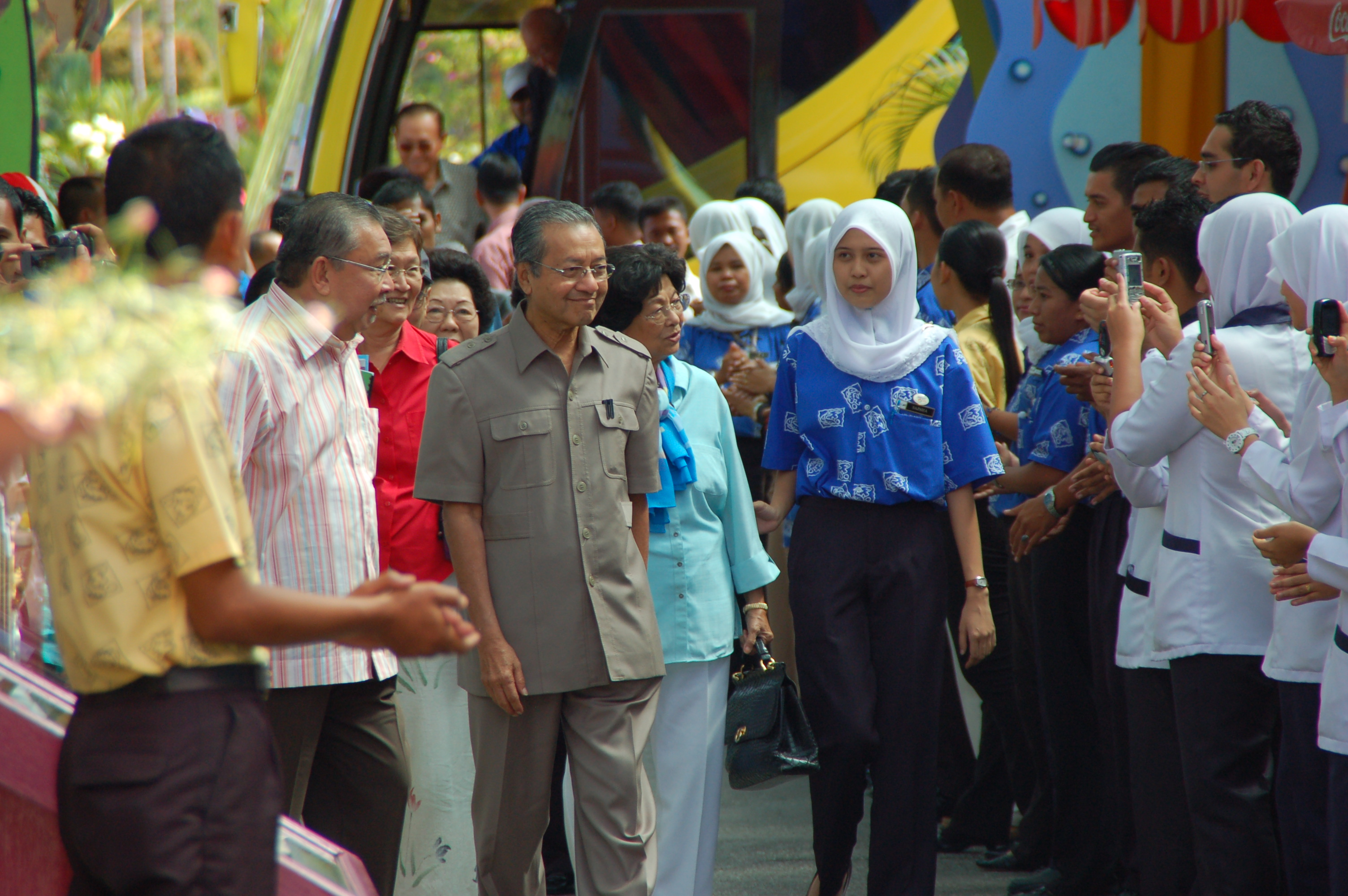
Siti Hasmah (centre) seen alongside her husband, Mahathir, during a visitation trip at Bukit Merah, Perak

She often accompanied Mahathir on official visits and holidays, starting with their first trip to Japan in 1961. Over the years, she travelled to nearly every country, including remote islands and Antarctica, with Afghanistan being the only exception. Their favourite holiday destination was Japan. Siti Hasmah once mentioned that she watched Star Wars with Mahathir in Houston.

Unlike many Malaysian Muslim women who follow the tradition of wearing the tudung (headscarf), Siti Hasmah did not wear one. However, in March 2025, she was seen wearing a tudung while attending a breaking-of-fast event organised by the Malaysian Islamic Welfare Organisation (Perkim), drawing public attention due to her rare public appearance in a hijab.

On 27 October 2024, Siti Hasmah revealed in an interview on the Coffee with Ryan podcast that her original name did not include "Siti". She explained that the prefix was added in the 1970s when she was appointed as a medical officer, as "Siti" was a popular trend at the time. She requested that people no longer use "Siti" before her name.

Siti Hasmah was also the honorary adviser of the Perdana Global Peace Foundation (PGPF).

Siti Hasmah attending the PLF Book Launch and Special Dialogue, May 2025

=== Health ===
In March 2019, Siti Hasmah underwent surgery to remove a small lump in her left breast after a mammogram and a biopsy confirmed its presence. After recovering, she shared her experience of undergoing breast cancer treatment during the Kuala Lumpur-level Breast Cancer Awareness Campaign, urging women to prioritize early screening and treatment.

On 26 August 2019, Siti Hasmah was admitted to Prince Court Medical Centre due to mild food poisoning. She had been scheduled to accompany Mahathir on his three-day official visit to Vietnam. While in Hanoi, Mahathir assured reporters that her condition had improved and expressed his intention to visit her upon returning to Kuala Lumpur, saying, "I miss her… we have been married for 60 years." After three days of treatment, Siti Hasmah was discharged from the hospital on 29 August.

On 26 September 2026, Siti Hasmah was admitted to the National Heart Institute (IJN) for an undisclosed medical condition. According to her son, Mukhriz, she suffered a heart attack at the hospital on the morning of 28 September, after which her condition became critical.

== Awards and recognitions ==
Siti Hasmah Digital Library entrance at MMU Cyberjaya Campus

In recognition of her public service, she was conferred the Seri Setia Mahkota Malaysia (SSM) in 2003, which carries the title of Tun. Her other honours included state decorations, honorary doctorates from several universities, and the Lifetime Achievement Award at the Asia HRD Awards in 2019. In August 2026, she was recognised by ASEAN Records as the oldest living spouse of a former prime minister in Southeast Asia. She and Mahathir also jointly received recognition from ASIA Records as the first former head of government and spouse to both reach centenarian age while alive.

== In popular culture ==
Siti Hasmah has been portrayed in theatre, documentaries, and films. She was portrayed by Erra Fazira in the theatre in Mahathir, the Musical (2010). In Teater Tun Siti Hasmah (2012), she was played by Sofia Jane and Lisa Surihani. This play, staged at Istana Budaya, followed the life of Siti Hasmah, with one actress playing her in her younger years, and another playing her following her marriage to Mahathir. She appeared in an episode of Upin & Ipin along with Mahathir in May 2018.

She was also portrayed in two films—by Fadhilah Mansor in Kapsul (2015) and by Fauziah Latiff in Mahathir: The Journey (2022 or 2023), as it was shot in 2019 and early 2020 before the Movement control order and the COVID-19 pandemic in Malaysia.

Siti Hasmah was also featured in the 2019 documentary M for Malaysia, which chronicled the 2018 general election campaign. The film included behind-the-scenes footage of Siti Hasmah and Mahathir, as well as interviews with Siti Hasmah.

In August 2018, portraits of Siti Hasmah and her husband were exhibited at Tun M: A Forever Legacy, an art exhibition featuring works inspired by Mahathir by artists from more than 40 countries. In 2025, Malaysian cartoonist Lat created a commemorative artwork depicting Siti Hasmah and Mahathir, for the celebration of Mahathir's 100th birthday organised by the Perdana Leadership Foundation.

== Books ==
- Siti Hasmah: Lady of Two Eras. 2000.
- My Name is Hasmah. Karangkraf Group, 2016.
- Tun Dr. Siti Hasmah Mohd Ali: The Accidental Doctor. 2020.
- Speaking of Mass Destruction, 2021.
