= Mokhzani Mahathir =

Malaysian politician

Yang Berbahagia Tan Sri Dato' Mokhzani Mahathir PSM DSDK
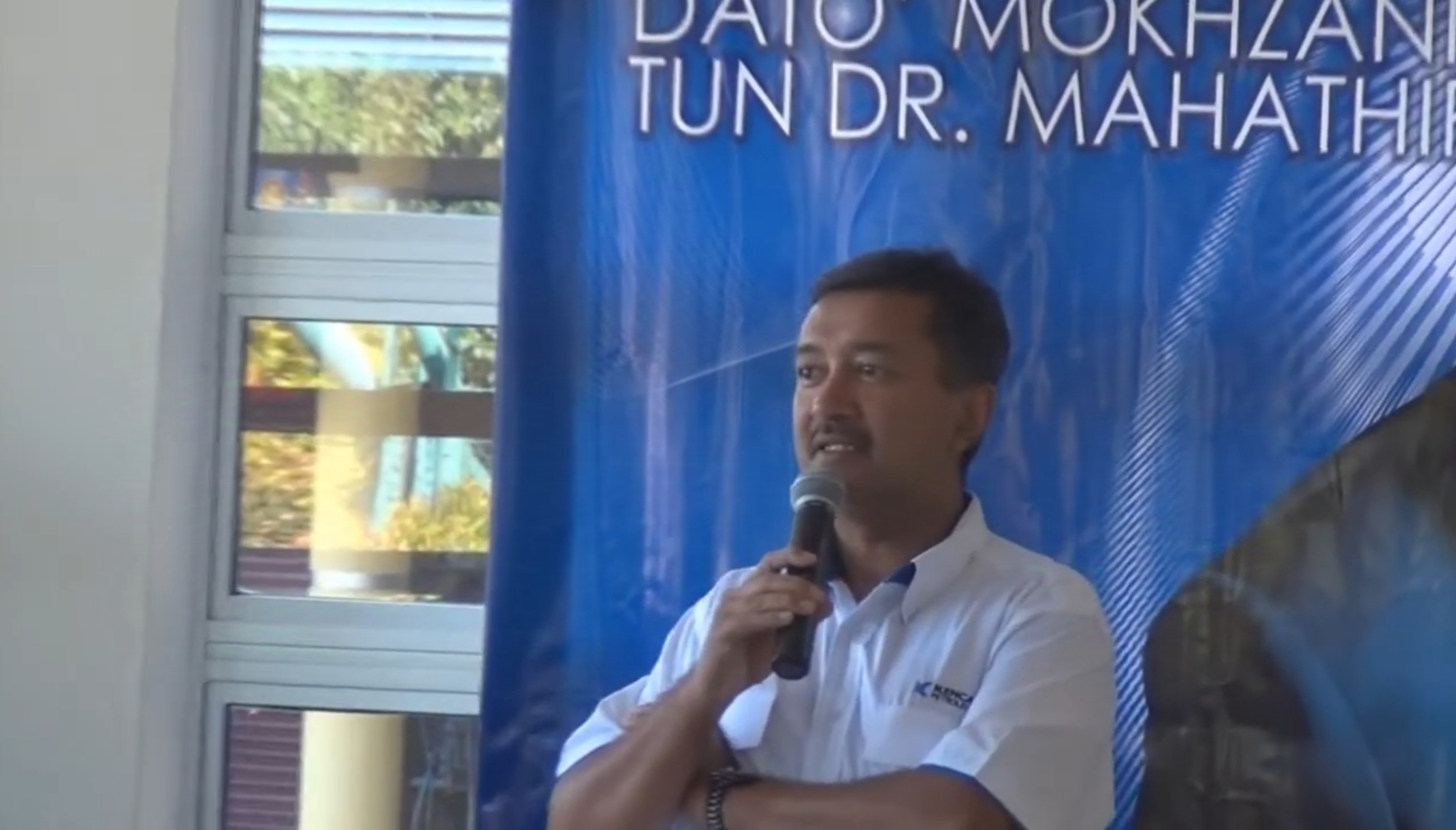
- Mokhzani in 2012
- Born: 2 January 1961 (age 65); Alor Setar, Kedah, Federation of Malaya (now Malaysia)
- Education: University of Tulsa (BEng)
- Spouse: Mastisa Mohamed
- Children: 5
- Parent(s): Mahathir Mohamad; Siti Hasmah Mohamad Ali

Mokhzani bin Mahathir (born 2 January 1961) is a Malaysian businessman. He worked as a petroleum engineer before founding oil-equipment fabricator Kencana Petroleum. Kencana Petroleum later merged with SapuraCrest to form SapuraKencana Petroleum. The company is now known as Sapura Energy.

Mokhzani was formerly a senior official in Kedah UMNO, but has since retired from politics. He is the second eldest son of the former Prime Minister of Malaysia Tun Dr. Mahathir Mohamad.

== Career ==
Like his younger brother Mukhriz, Mokhzani is a businessman and had played an active role in United Malays National Organisation (UMNO), and at one time serving as the Youth's Wing treasurer. As of 2006, Mokhzani was an UMNO delegate of one of the constituencies in Kedah, but has since lain dormant in his political activities. In May 2008, he followed his father's footsteps to quit UMNO, after 22 years as a member of the Sungai Layar Hujung branch of UMNO.

In June 2019, Mokhzani resigned from all positions in Opcom Group due to "personal reasons".

== Personal life ==
Mokhzani is currently married to Mastisa Mohamed, a businesswoman. Together they have five children, and currently reside in Kuala Lumpur.

== Personal fortune ==
Mokhzani has been listed as the 14th richest person in Malaysia by Forbes Asia with an estimated net worth of US$685 million in 2012. Mokhzani was also the chairman of the Sepang International Circuit.

== Honours ==
- Malaysia
  - Commander of the Order of Loyalty to the Crown of Malaysia (PSM) – Tan Sri (2014)
- Kedah
  - Knight Companion of the Order of Loyalty to the Royal House of Kedah (DSDK) – Dato' (2001)
