= SMKA Tun Hajah Rahah =

- Tun Hajah Rahah Religious National Secondary School

Location
- Pekan Simpang Lima; Southeast Asia; Sungai Besar, Sabak Bernam, Selangor; Malaysia
- Coordinates: 3.61775°N 101.0497568°E

Information
- Motto: Disiplin Teras Kejayaan (Discipline is the Key to Success).
- Established: 1983
- Founder: Ministry of Education
- Category: Religious National Secondary School
- Principal: Mr Haji Jaafar Rajuli
- Vice Principal: Mdm Hajjah Jamaliah Jahari
- Yearbook: Al-Hidayah
- Sister's School: Universitas Islam Negeri Sumatera Utara
- Website: www.smkasl.bpi.edu.my

SMKA Tun Hajah Rahah or Tun Hajah Rahah Religious National Secondary School (Arabic: المدرسة الثانوية الوطنية الدينية تون حجة راحة; Malay: Sekolah Menengah Kebangsaan Agama Tun Hajah Rahah;) is a Malaysia educational institution established in 1982. The institution is located at town Simpang Lima, Sungai Besar in the District of Sabak Bernam, Selangor, Malaysia.

== History ==
=== Foundation ===
In 1979, the Ministry of Education under the Division of Technical and Vocational and the Selangor State Education Department were planning to build a vocational school for agriculture in Selangor. The development was financed by a special facilities loan for education development from the World Bank. An area of 19.75 acres (79,900 m^{2}) at an agricultural village in Simpang Lima was chosen as the site for construction. The site selection was based on the factors that the land was an undeveloped state-owned land.

==== SMK Simpang Lima ====
The school was named Simpang Lima after a penta-junction at Jalan Kuala Selangor Lama near Sungai Nibong village. The construction completed in 1982 and the school was finally opened for admission in January 1982. However, due to political and public pressure, it was established as SMK Simpang Lima, a public secondary school and not as a vocational school as per planned.

==== SMKA Simpang Lima ====
After six years of service, there was a move by the school's Parent-Teacher Association with recommendation from the District Education Office of Sabak Bernam, to elevate the school status into a religious boarding school.

This proposal was accepted by the Ministry of Education and the Selangor Education Department. In 1988, the school's name was officially changed from SMK Simpang Lima to SMKA Simpang Lima.

==== SMKA Sabak Bernam ====
In 2015, the school was rebranded as SMKA Sabak Bernam to represent the whole district of Sabak Bernam.

==== SMKA Tun Rahah ====
In 2016, the school was rebranded as SMKA Tun Rahah

=== Development ===
At its opening, the school was made up of 1 double-storey block for administration, 3 double-storey blocks for classrooms, 1 single-storey block for laboratories and workshop, 8 medium quarters for teachers and school staff, and a canteen. When the school gradually evolved into a boarding school, one of the classroom blocks was converted into a hostel.

In 1992, the school received 4 new three-storey hostel block and a dining hall. In the same year, with the effort from the PTA and the local communities, a new surau was built.

In 1998, under the Sixth Malaysia Plan (RMK6), the Ministry of Education approved another construction of one three-storey classroom block and two three-storey hostel blocks, a new dining hall for female students, a water tank and two new playing court.

In 2002, the school received a new Multipurpose Hall and a new shuttle bus.

In 2004, the new one storey Computer Laboratories block completed.

In 2008, the school received a Class C Quarters for Headmaster residence and a new block next to the Multipurpose Hall.

=== Head Teachers ===
No.	Name	Years of Service
1.	Mr Haji Samuri	1983-2000
2.	Mr Haji Sariman bin Rejo	2000-2003
3.	Mr Haji Amin	2003-2008
4.	Mdm Hajjah Fatimah Abdullah	2008-2012
5.	Mr Haji Jaafar Rajuli	2012-2018
6.	Mr Haji Jeffree Bin Dollah Humari	2018-now

== Facilities ==
Management

- Principal Office
- Vice Principals' Office
- Head Warden Office
- Male Teachers' Room
- Female Teacher's Room
- Clerk Office

Resources

- Library
- Resource Centre
- Musolla
- English Resource Centre
- English Room
- Mathematic Room
- BADAR Operational Room
- Arabic Site
- Bahasa Melayu Site

Laboratories and Workshops

- Computer Laboratory
- Science Laboratory
- Biology Laboratory
- Chemical Laboratory
- Physic Laboratory
- Living Skills Workshop

== See also ==
- Education in Malaysia
- Religious National Boarding School
- Sungai Besar
