= Marina Mahathir =

Daughter of Malaysian Prime Minister

Yang Berbahagia Datin Paduka Marina Mahathir DPMS
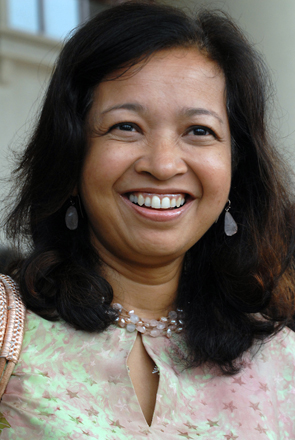
- Marina in 2008
- Born: Marina binti Mahathir; 11 May 1957 (age 69); Alor Setar, Kedah, Federation of Malaya
- Education: University of Sussex; University of East Anglia
- Occupations: Activist, columnist
- Spouses: Didier Roussille (m. 1986; div. 1994) Tara Sosrowardoyo (m. 1998)
- Children: 3
- Parents: Mahathir Mohamad (father); Siti Hasmah (mother)
- Website: rantingsbymm.blogspot.com

Datin Paduka Marina binti Mahathir (Jawi: مرينة بنت محاضر; born 11 May 1957) is a Malaysian socio-political activist and writer. She is the eldest child of the 4th and 7th Prime Minister of Malaysia, Mahathir Mohamad and Siti Hasmah. She graduated with a degree in international relations from the University of Sussex and in 2019, completed a master's in Biography and Creative Non-Fiction at the University of East Anglia.

== Career ==
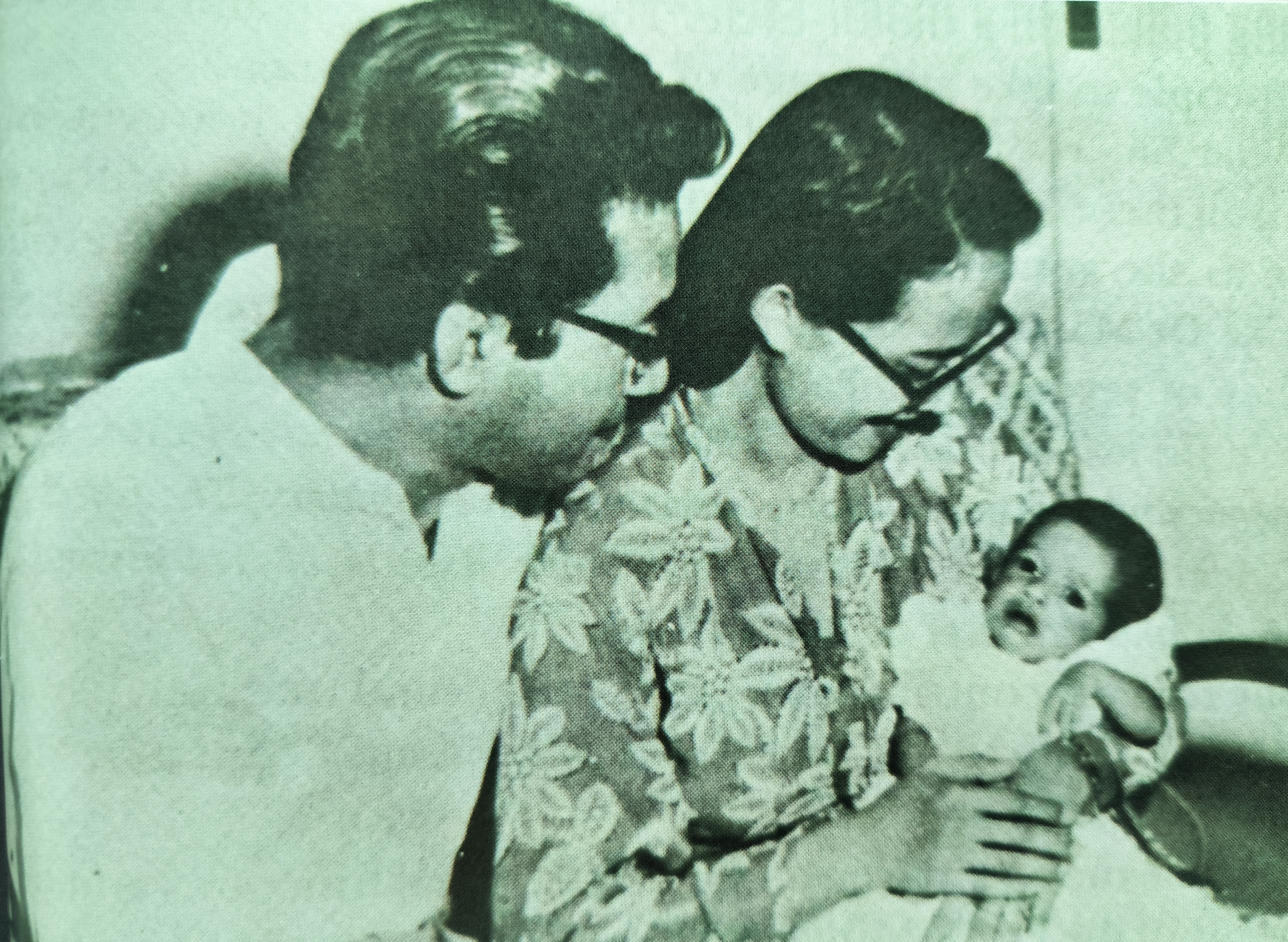
The photo taken one month after Marina was born in June 1957

She was president of the Malaysian AIDS Council from 1993 to 2005. An active socio-political blogger, she also writes in her bi-weekly column called Musings in The Star newspaper since 1989. Some of her pieces in the column have been published in her books such as 50 Days: Rantings by MM, published in 1997 and Telling It Straight, published in 2012 by Editions Didier Millet. The latter is a selection of her articles published in her column between 2003 and 2012. It includes a foreword by Farish A. Noor, a local political scientist and historian. It contains 90 articles which are written thematically including a specially written introduction on the topics discussed in the book. It also includes two previously unpublished articles.

She is an active campaigner for women's rights. In 2006 she has described the status of Muslim women in Malaysia as similar to that of the Black South Africans under apartheid.

Marina has called for an end to discrimination based on sexual orientations in 1998 and 1999.

She had appeared in Mahathir's Documentary released in late 2009 with the rest of the members of the Mahathir Family.

In 2010, she was awarded UN Person of The Year for her volunteer work in combatting HIV/AIDS.

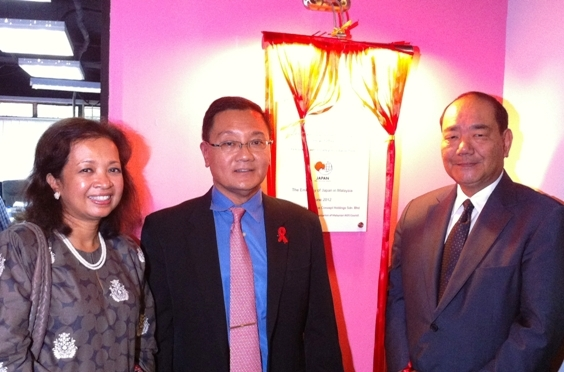
On 28 August 2012, Marina (Left), Hisham Hussein, Chairman of PT Foundation (Middle) and Ambassador of Japan to Malaysia H.E. Shigeru Nakamura (Right)

In 2016, Marina denounced the loss of Malaysian culture and traditions by what she perceives as "Arab colonialism". When asked about her activism, she stated, "It is how I act out my life as a Muslim."

In January 2018, following a viral incident of a Muslim man slapping a Muslim woman for not wearing a hijab, Marina warned that Islamization of Malaysia was "divisive in our society". She referred to Islamization as "another form of colonisation, a concept that has never been known to being non-violent".

== Personal life ==
On 7 June 1998, Marina married Tara Sosrowardoyo, an Indonesian photographer. They have two daughters and a son.

Previously, she was married to Didier Roussille, a Frenchman. Marina and Didier have a daughter, Ineza Roussille.

== Bibliography ==
- 50 days: Rantings, ZI Publications Sdn. Bhd, 2009. ISBN 9789675266003
- Hidden voices: true Malaysian experience of AIDS, as editor, with Wan Zawawi Ibrahim, Malaysian AIDS Councils, 1999. ISBN 9834019211
- In Liberal Doses, Star Publications, 1997. ISBN 978-9839950779
- Eyes: a photographic journey through the Association of Southeast Asian Nations, with Rene Burbi and Leonard Lueras, Eyes on Asian, 1993. ISBN 0356044149
- Telling It Straight, EDM Pte Ltd, 2012. ISBN 978-981-4385-29-9
- The Apple and the Tree: Life as Dr Mahathir's Daughter, Penguin Books, 2021. ISBN 9789-8149-5422-8

== Awards and accolades ==
=== Honours of Malaysia ===
- Selangor
  - Knight Commander of the Order of the Crown of Selangor (DPMS) – Datin Paduka (1999)

=== Foreign honours ===
- France
  - Knight of the National Order of the Legion of Honour (2016)

In 2016, Marina was conferred the Chevalier de la Légion d’Honneur by the French government for “her voice and charisma to many causes”, citing her work with the Malaysian AIDS Council and with migrants as examples. Marina became one of eight Malaysians to receive the award so far.

== See also ==
- Women in Malaysia
- LGBT rights in Malaysia
