= National Heart Institute (Malaysia) =

Heart surgery centre in Kuala Lumpur, Malaysia

Coordinates: 3.170197°N 101.708937°E

Institut Jantung Negara Sdn Bhd

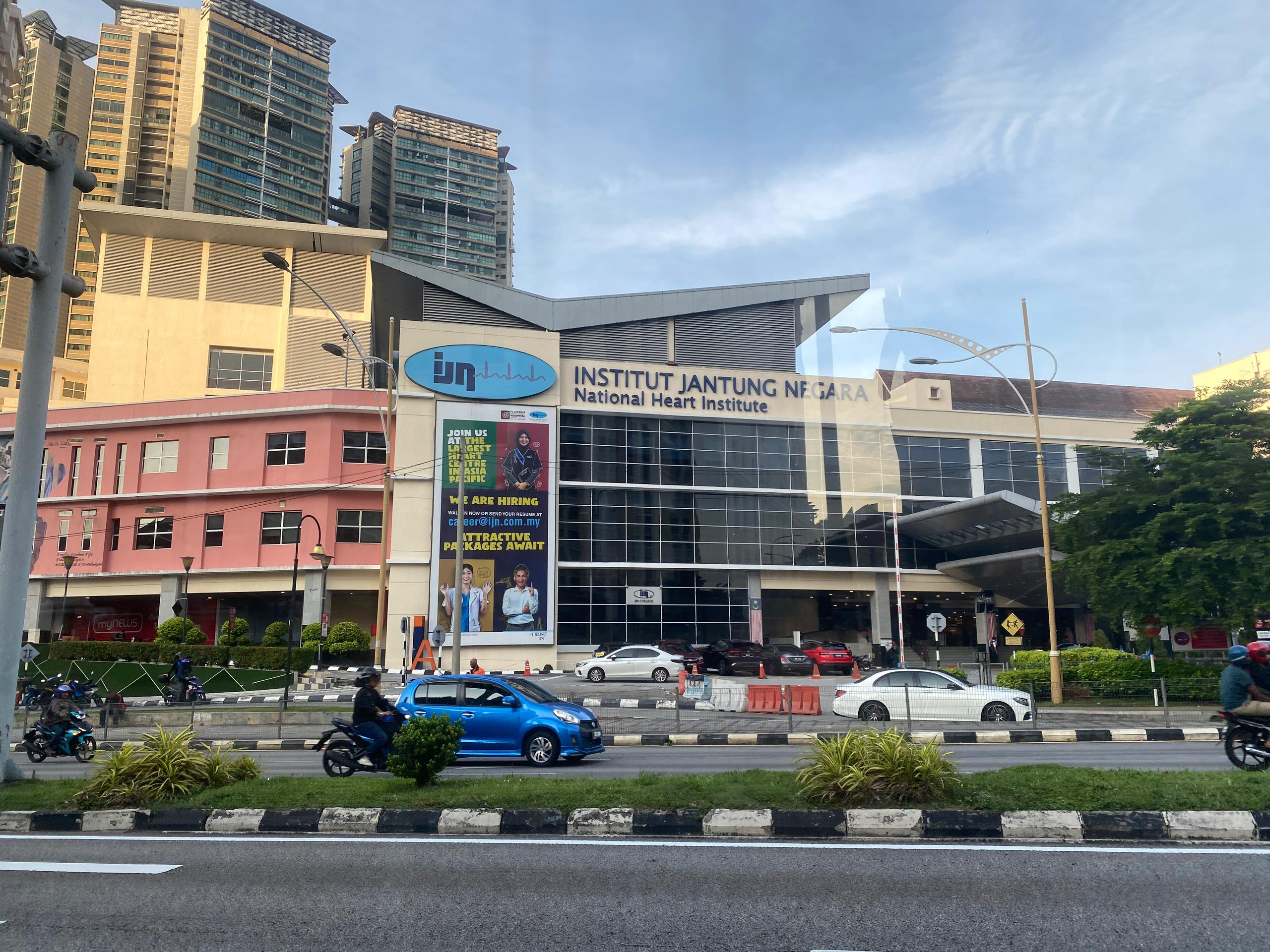
- Company type: State-owned enterprise
- Industry: Healthcare
- Founded: 1 August 1984; 41 years ago
- Headquarters: No. 145, Jalan Tun Razak, 50400 Kuala Lumpur, Malaysia
- Key people: Noor Hisham Abdullah, Chairman; Mohd Azhari Yakub, Chief Executive Officer
- Parent: Minister of Finance Incorporated
- Website: www.ijn.com.my

Institut Jantung Negara Sdn Bhd (also known as National Heart Institute; abbreviation IJN), is a heart surgery centre in Jalan Tun Razak, Kuala Lumpur, Malaysia.

It is located adjacent to the Kuala Lumpur Hospital.

== History ==
The IJN was first established in 1984 by a few cardiologists and general physicians and was situated at the GHKL's old blood bank office, and the current IJN's logo was created in the same year of 1984. IJN later moved to its current location in 1992. The institutes specialises in cardiology and cardiothoracic surgery services for both adult and paediatric cases. As the national referral centre for cardiovascular disease, IJN sees new cases referred from all over the country and abroad and follow-up cases at the outpatient clinics.

IJN went through an expansion which was completed in late 2009. Following the expansion, the number of beds dedicated for heart treatment increased to 432, making IJN one of the largest heart centres in the region. In March 2019, pioneer surgeon Yahya Awang announced the takeover of IJN by the Ministry of Health from the Ministry of Finance.
