= Seri Perdana =

Official residence of the Prime Minister of Malaysia located in Putrajaya

Coordinates: 2°57′6.1″N 101°41′23.1″E

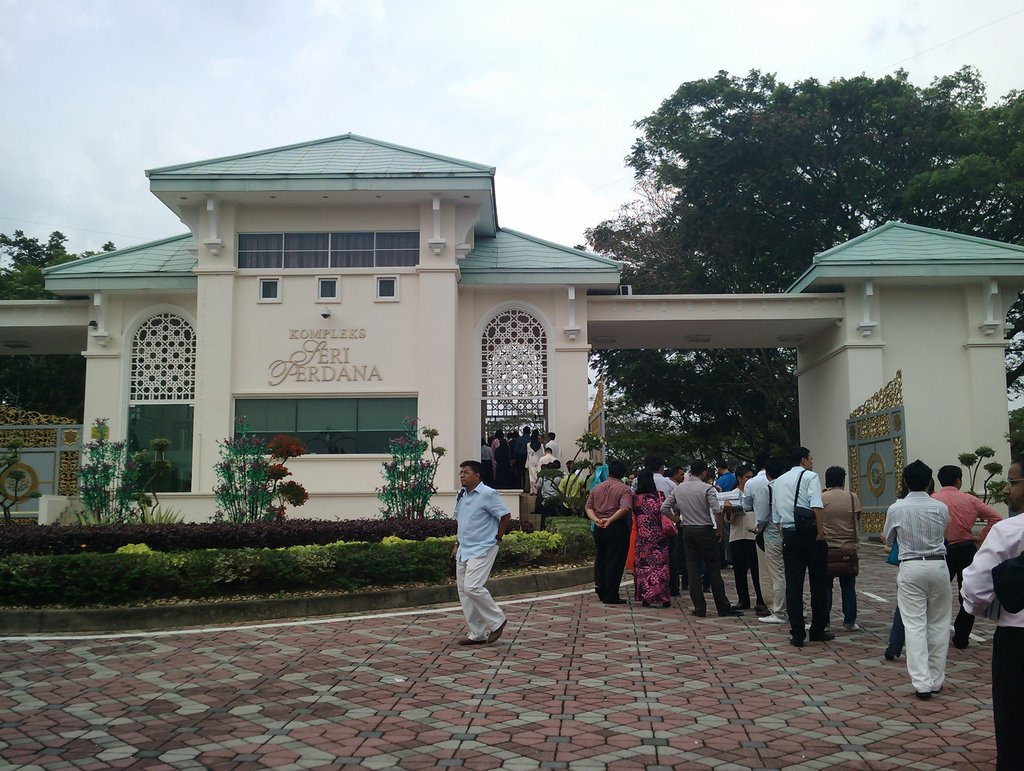
- Seri Perdana
- Interactive map of the Seri Perdana area

General information
- Status: Completed
- Location: Putrajaya, Malaysia
- Current tenants: Anwar Ibrahim, Prime Minister of Malaysia
- Construction started: 1997
- Completed: 1999
- Cost: RM 24.17 million

Technical details
- Size: 42.5 acres (17.2 ha)

Website
- www.pmo.gov.my

Seri Perdana is the official residence of the prime minister of Malaysia, located in Putrajaya, Malaysia.

== History ==
Construction began in 1997 and was completed in 1999. The building shares similar architecture with Perdana Putra. The first resident of this house was Mahathir Mohamad in his first term of prime ministership, followed by Abdullah Ahmad Badawi, Najib Razak, Mahathir Mohamad for the second time, Muhyiddin Yassin, Ismail Sabri Yaakob, and Anwar Ibrahim.

== Architecture ==
- VIP Hall
- Meeting Hall
- Surau
- Banquet Hall
- Prime Minister's main house
- Administration Office
- Quarters house
- South Garden
- North Garden

== See also ==
- Putrajaya
