= Pallava (disambiguation) =

Pallava dynasty (Ancient Greek: Παλλάυα, romanized: Palláva) was an ethnic Tamil royal dynasty ruling most of South India between the 3rd and the 9th centuries.

Pallava may also refer to:

- Pallava script, a Brahmic script of southern India, during the dynasty's rule
- Pallava coinage, coinage of the dynasty
- Panch Pallava, a ritual assortment of five different leaves used as a totem by the Maratha culture in India
- Abhishek Pallava, an Indian police officer

== See also ==
- Palava (disambiguation)
- Palaver (disambiguation)
- Pallav, an Indian male given name
- Pallavi (disambiguation)
- Polava, a river of Saxony, Germany and of the Czech Republic
