= Pallavi (disambiguation) =

Pallavi is the thematic line of a song in Carnatic music.

Pallavi may also refer to:

== Films ==
- Pallavi (1976 film), an Indian Kannada film
- Pallavi (1977 film), an Indian Malayalam film

== Other ==
- Pallavi (given name)
- Pallavi (actress) (born 1965), Indian actress
- Ragam Thanam Pallavi, a form of singing in Carnatic music
- Pallavi Model School, a group of English medium co-educational schools in Hyderabad, India

== See also ==
- Pallava (disambiguation)
- Palava (disambiguation)
- Anupallavi (disambiguation)
- Pallav, an Indian male given name
- Pahlavi (disambiguation)
