= Palava =

Palava may refer to:

- Palava City, a city in the Indian state of Maharashtra
- Palavas-les-Flots, a commune on the French Mediterranean coast
- Palava Juss., a taxonomic synonym of the plant genus Palaua

== See also ==
- Palav (disambiguation)
- Palaver (disambiguation)
- Pallava (disambiguation)
- Pallav, an Indian male given name
- Polava, a river of Saxony, Germany and of the Czech Republic
