= Palaver =

Palaver may refer to:

- Palaver (custom), a form of local conflict resolution in different African countries
- "Palaver", meaning a long discussion or procedure, from the Portuguese word "palavra". See List of English words of Portuguese origin.
- Palaver Point, on the west side of Two Hummock Island, in the Palmer Archipelago
- Palaver (1926 film), by Geoffrey Barkas, the first Nigerian feature film
- Palaver (1969 film), a Dutch-language Belgian fantasy film directed by Emile Degelin
- Palaver sauce, a type of stew eaten in West Africa

== See also ==
- Palava (disambiguation)
- Pallava (disambiguation)
- Polava, a river of Saxony, Germany and of the Czech Republic
