= TXFM =

Coordinates: 53°20′27″N 6°15′52″W

- Dublin; Ireland
- Broadcast area: County Dublin, Ireland
- Frequencies: FM: 105.2 MHz; Virgin Media Ireland: 935
- RDS: TXFM
- Branding: Dublin's New Music Source

Programming
- Language: English
- Format: Alternative Rock
- Network: Communicorp

Ownership
- Owner: Dublin Rock Radio Ltd.

History
- First air date: 31 October 2006 (as Phantom FM); 31 March 2014 (rebranded as TXFM)
- Last air date: 26 October 2016 8.13PM
- Former names: Phantom 105.2

TXFM (formerly Phantom 105.2) was a Dublin-based radio station, founded in 1997 as a pirate radio station. TXFM broadcast under a contract awarded by the Broadcasting Authority of Ireland (BAI). The station ceased broadcasting on 26 October 2016.

TXFM played mostly alternative rock with an emphasis on local artists, as well as alternative dance and hip-hop from local and international acts. Apart from general programming TXFM also has run many specialist shows dedicated to a specific genre of rock or to premiering new Irish and international acts.

Following the re-advertisement of the 'Alternative Rock' radio license by the BAI in December 2015, no formal applications had been made by the closing date, and on 30 March 2016 it was announced that the station was to cease broadcasting by October of that year.

The frequency of 105.2 MHz is now used for temporary licensed stations such as Freedom FM, Classic Hits 80s and Christmas FM at a maximium ERP of 2.00kW.

== History ==
=== 1997–2014: Phantom ===
Logo of Phantom FM until 2014.

Until 2003, Phantom operated as a pirate station, staying on air the majority of the time, apart from outages caused by frequency collisions with newly licensed stations, fear of raids by Comreg, and once, the theft of their transmission equipment from Three Rock Mountain. Since 2003, they have operated as an internet radio station, and under two temporary radio contracts (2003 and 2004) from the Broadcasting Commission of Ireland.

Funding for Phantom during their pirate era came from sponsorship and advertising from local bands and promoters and even contributions from station staff.

A number of times during this period, the station went off air for licence applications. After two successful temporary licenses, Phantom applied for an alternative rock license offered by the BCI for Dublin in July 2004. They finally won a licence for an alternative rock station for Dublin in November 2004, beating the Zed FM consortium, XFM and two other applicants.

Phantom's expected launch was delayed due to a legal challenges against the BCI regarding the license from Scrollside Ltd./Zed FM. An unsuccessful challenge to the High Court was followed by an appeal to the Supreme Court which was rejected on 6 April 2006. Phantom returned to the airwaves on 31 October 2006, broadcasting on 105.2 FM.

Phantom 105.2 won the award for best music driven local station at the 2007 PPI Awards.

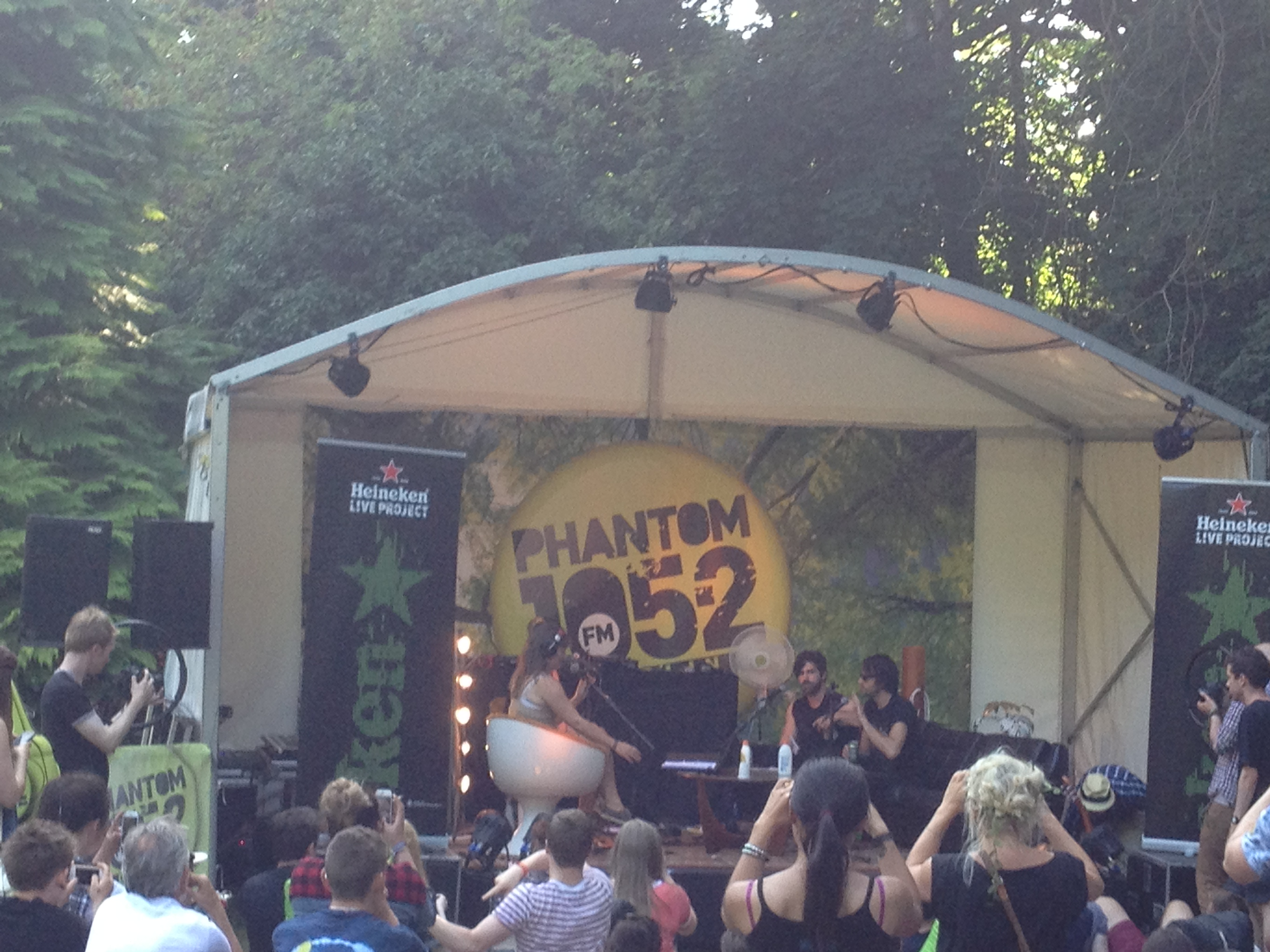
Phantom 105.2's Claire Beck and Dee Reddy interviewing Foals at the 2013 Longitude Festival in Dublin.

In 2010, Communicorp took a 30% stake and the station was relocated to Marconi House in January 2011 where it shares facilities with Today FM and Newstalk. A number of redundancies resulted from the move and cost cutting including the redundancies of Marketing Manager Brian Daly and Traffic Manager Laura Lee Conboy (she continued with her presenter role) along with the resignation of Chief Executive Ger Roe and the dismissal of General Manager Simon Maher. Ricky Geraghty replaced Ger Roe as CEO and Keith Walsh replaced Fiona Scally as programme director.

In August 2012, it was announced that a number of weekend presenters would be leaving the station in a bid to cut costs.

=== 2014: Job cuts and restructuring plans ===
On 14 February 2014, the board of directors of Dublin Rock Radio Ltd, trading as Phantom 105.2 announced that up to twenty staff would be made redundant. In a statement issued to the press, managers of the station said that the Broadcasting Authority of Ireland had granted permission to restructure the business "in order to ensure its long-term viability".

In February 2014, it was announced that an agreement had been reached with the Broadcasting Authority of Ireland to restructure the station resulting in the loss of many full and part-time staff with the exception of a handful of presenters. The station would then be rebranded as TXFM with closer operational links with Today FM, also owned by Communicorp and who also broadcast from the same building.

On 16 March 2014 the station ceased broadcasting as Phantom 105.2. The last live show was Power House presented by John Caddell. Back to back music was then broadcast with the station being renamed 105.2 with no reference to Phantom. A number of on-air, backroom and support staff lost their jobs.

=== 2014–2016: As TXFM ===
It was subsequently confirmed that TXFM would relaunch on 31 March 2014, with a mix of existing and new presenters. Initially, it was announced that only three of the daytime presenters would be left. In the event, more presenters were kept on. A number of new weekend and once-a-weeknight presenters were included in the new schedule, including musician Gavin Glass who went on to Radio NOVA. The new lineup would see presented programmes from 7am to midnight on weekdays, including nightly two-hour specialist shows from 10pm; weekends would see a mix of presenter-led and specialist shows, including a Saturday night 'indie anthems' marathon.

On 30 March 2016, the Broadcasting Authority of Ireland announced that no applications had been received for the license held by Dublin Rock Radio Limited, broadcasting as TXFM.

Some of the station's specialist content such as The Set-List, Metal March, TXFM Evenings, The Pick-Up, Souled Out, Transmission, Nialler 9, Friday Nights, The Listening Post and Another Side were axed from the station at the end of June 2016, while Songs in the Key of Life with Nadine O'Regan made the transition from its slot on TXFM to sister station Today FM which is also a national radio station. From July 2016, the stations schedule was reduced to only a few hours of live content each day with the majority of the schedule made up of automated songs.

=== Closure ===
The station ceased broadcasting on Wednesday, 26 October 2016 at 20:12h with the full 14 minutes 57 seconds of Pulp's "The Day After The Revolution" as the final song. The JNLR radio figures released that week showed that in its final three months on air, the station's listenership had actually increased from 16,000 (Q2 2016) to 19,000 (Q3 2016).

=== Relaunch ===
Communicorp Media ( now Bauer Media Audio Ireland since June 2018) launched an alternative indie digital radio station called Today XM paying homage to TXFM on 17 May 2018. The digital radio station's logo is similar to TXFM and plays a similar playlist - however the station has no regular shows or presenters. This station has been discontinued as of February 2026.

== Awards ==
- PPI Music Driven Local Station Of The Year (2007)
- Digital Media Awards – Best Entertainment Content (Web/Mobile) (2008)
- Irish Web Awards – Best Radio Station Website (2008 & 2009)
- Highly Commended in the Allianz Business to Arts Awards 2010 (Best Sponsorship of an Event)
- PPI New Irish Music/Musical Talent Programming (2013) Icon – Songwriter Special
- PPI Awards 2016 - Left of the Dial Documentary by Cathal Funge.
