= Pahlavan =

Pahlavan may refer to:

== Sports ==
- Varzesh-e Pahlavani, traditional Iranian wrestling
- Pehlwani, traditional Indian wrestling
- Oil wrestling or pehlivani, traditional Turkish wrestling

== Places ==
- Pahlavan, Iran, a village in West Azerbaijan Province, Iran
- Pahlavan, Sistan and Baluchestan, a village in Sistan and Baluchestan Province, Iran

== People ==
- Ali Pahlavan (born 1975), Iranian musician, singer-songwriter, lyricist and composer
- Kaveh Pahlavan (born 1951), professor at Worcester Polytechnic Institute, Worcester, Massachusetts

== Other ==
- Pehlivan, Turkish surname
- Jahan Pahlavan, Iranian title
- Pahlevan of Iran, national championship for traditional Iranian wrestling
- Parthians, an ancient people in Iran
- Pahlavuni, Armenian noble family
- Pahlavani language, extinct variety of Persian spoken in the Chakhansur District, Nimruz Province, Afghanistan; similar to Dari
- Pehlewani, older form of Southern Kurdish
- Pahlwan, 2019 Indian wrestling film by S. Krishna

== See also ==
- Pahlawan (disambiguation)
- Pehlivan (disambiguation)
- Pahlavi (disambiguation)
