= Palawa =

Palawa may refer to:

== Places in India ==
- Palawa, Alwar, a village in India
- Palawa, Jharkhand, a town in India

== Relating to Tasmanian Aboriginal people ==
- Aboriginal Tasmanians or Palawa people, the Indigenous people of the island state of Tasmania, Australia
- Palawa languages, group of Tasmanian languages spoken by Indigenous people
  - Palawa kani, a language of the Palawa people

== See also ==
- Palawan (disambiguation)
