= Kurumbaradittan =

Kurumbaradittan (also known as Kumarandai Kurumbaradittan; alias Kadu Pattipperaraiyan) was a regional chief associated with Kurumba tribal community, who is mentioned in Satyavedu Tamil Inscription. According to the temple inscription preserved in Matangeshwara temple, he flourished during the reign of Pallava king Aparajita Varman, of Pallava dynasty (r.c. 880–897 CE). The inscription is assigned to the fourth year of Aparajita Varman and record the Kurumbaradittan’s religious endowment to the Shiva Temple.

== Satyavedu Temple inscriptions ==
The Satyavedu Temple inscriptions documents Kurumbaradittans donation of the village of Turaiyur including its income which are in gold and ‘puravu’ for religious and temple maintenance at the Mahadeva temple at Matangapalli. The gifts and contributions of Kurumbaradittan to the temple are inscribed on Matangeshwara Temple stones at Satyavedu. The record also provides valuable geographical information which identifies the temple as situated at Tirumantanganpalli of Tekkurnadu, a subdivision of Paiyyur Ilankotam, a administrative division of Pallava Kingdom.

The donated village of Turaiyur has been identified by epigraphists with the present-day village of the same name, Thuraiyur in the Madurantakam taluk of the present-day Chengalpattu District of Tamil Nadu. The inscription is regarded as the important source for understanding the role of local chieftains, specifically Kurumbas in supporting the religious temples of late Pallava period.

== Etymology ==
Kurumbaradittan literally means ‘Sun of the Kurumbas’, where Kurumba means “a historically pastoral shepherd, or hill dwelling community of south India, whereas ‘Adittan’ means ‘sun’.

== Association with Pallava dynasty ==
Although Satyavedu inscription describes Kumarandai Kurumbaradditan as belonging to the Sera Nadu (Chera Nadu), it does not explicitly explain his political relationship with Aparajita Varman or other pallave rulers. The relationship between the Kurumbas and Pallava dynasty has long been debated by historians. Some scholars believe Kurumba’s were an independent tribal or pastoral rulers that later came under pallava authority while other have proposed that the Pallava themselves may have originated from or maintained a close ties with Kurumbas. Although no consensus has been reached, some inscriptions from pallava period record Kurumba chiefs making religious endowments and exercising local authority, suggesting at least some Kurumba Chiefs were part of the Pallava administrative system.

Nineteenth century British civil servant and antiquarian Sir Walter Elliot, also noted a close association between Kurumba and Pallava’s through his study of south Indian coinage. In his catalogues he categorized two lists of these coins under the heading, ‘Kurumbar or Pallava Coins of the Coromandel Coast’ and the other “Pallava Coins”, reflecting his view that two groups were historically connected.
