= Mary Strangman =

Irish doctor, health advocate and suffragist

- Born: Mary Somerville Parker Strangman; 16 March 1872; County Waterford, Ireland
- Died: January 30, 1943 (aged 70); Dún Laoghaire, Ireland
- Education: Royal College of Surgeons in Ireland (1896)

Mary Strangman (1872–1943), was an Irish doctor, public health advocate and women's suffragist. She was also Waterford's first woman Councillor.

== Early life and education ==
She was born Mary Somerville Parker Strangman on 16 March 1872, the second last of seven children to Thomas Handcock Strangman of Carriganore, Killotteran, County Waterford and Sarah White Hawkes, originally of Castle White, County Cork. She had four brothers and two sisters. Since her father was a gentleman, Strangman was educated at home. Both she and her sister Lucia attended the Royal College of Surgeons in Ireland in 1891. It was the first medical school in the either Ireland or Great Britain to allow women to attend on equal terms with men. Strangman graduated in 1896 and moved to England to gain experience. She worked initially as a clinical assistant at the Northumberland county asylum. Later, she worked as both an assistant anaesthetist and assistant obstetrician in a private hospital for women in London. During her position in London, she also lectured in midwifery to student nurses.

Strangman was the second woman to be awarded fellowship of the RCSI in 1902; the first was Emily Winifred Dickson in 1893. A year later, Strangman moved to Waterford city and set up a practice. There she also volunteered at local women's charities. During this time she focused on the treatment of alcoholism and morphine addiction. She published on the subject in the British Medical Journal and the Journal of Mental Science.

== Health activism ==
Once she had set up her practice in Waterford, Strangman became increasingly involved in activism focused on women's health. She was a co-founder of the Women's National Health Association of Ireland in Waterford in 1908. The main goal was to mobilise women in a campaign against Tuberculosis. It soon became clear that one of the biggest obstacles in Waterford was the local corporation. As a result, the association took a new tactic and when women became eligible for election to local government in 1911, Strangman became Waterford city's first woman councillor. She took up her position on 15 January 1912 and used it to highlight the issues locally with housing and tuberculosis. After the First World War, there were welfare problems in Waterford and Strangman united the local charities and voluntary organisations to resolve them. She retired from public service in 1920 and in 1923 she took up a role as physician at Waterford County and City Infirmary.

== Suffrage ==
Having proven she was a capable doctor, Strangman also believed in equality for women. She was a member of the Irish Women's Suffrage and Local Government Association and the Irish Women's Franchise League. Strangman formed a branch of the less militant organisation the Munster Women's Franchise League and spent time as a member of the executive committee of the Irishwomen's Suffrage Federation from 1911 to 1917. John Redmond was MP for Waterford and was an anti-suffragist. Strangman's strongly held views on the topic and position on the local corporation put her at odds with him. It made a difficult position more challenging.

She continued to practice medicine almost until her death. She died on 30 January 1943 in her sister's home in Dún Laoghaire near Dublin.

The Royal College of Surgeons in Ireland along with Accenture and Business to Arts decided to create a series of portraits of historical female leaders in healthcare which was unveiled as part of the Women On Walls series.
