= Johns Hopkins University in Malaysia =

Johns Hopkins University in Malaysia was a medical school and research facility that was announced in September 2010 as a joint venture between Johns Hopkins University and Academic Medical Centre Sdn Bhd (AMC), which to form Perdana University. Prime Minister Najib Razak stated that the school will be located at Serdang in Selangor state and will be part of a "medical city". It will be Malaysia's first private medical school with research facilities.

The school offered a four-year curriculum based on the "Genes to Society" concept and admit 100 students annually. Malaysia's minister for higher education said the school would focus on teaching, research, and providing healthcare. The curriculum is taught in Perdana University, a wholly owned subsidiary of AMC.

Malaysia's health minister said that the venture with Johns Hopkins was part of an effort to promote health tourism and encourage Malaysian physicians working overseas to return home.

Johns Hopkins University in Malaysia was a part of a larger effort by the Malaysian government to develop "education cities" in the Iskandar Development Region, Pagoh and Kuala Lumpur.

In August 2014, Perdana University announced discontinuation of their partnership.
