= Palav =

Palav may refer to:

- Pilaf, rice dish
- Shyam Palav, Indian cinematographer
- Bhagwan Dada, Indian actor, born Bhagwan Aabaji Palav

== See also ==
- Pallav, an Indian male given name
- Pallava (disambiguation)
