= Pahlawan =

Pahlawan may refer to:

== People ==
- Abdul Malik Pahlawan (fl. 1990s), an Uzbek warlord and politician
- Gocah Pahlawan (died c. 1641), founder of the Sultanate of Deli and the Sultanate of Serdang in North Sumatra, Indonesia
- Teuku Umar, Indonesian national hero known by the title “Johan Pahlawan”
- Gul Mohammad Pahalwan (fl. 1990s), an Uzbek military leader
- Muhammad Jahan Pahlavan, ruler of the Eldiguzids 1175–1186
- Rasul Pahlawan (died 1996), an Uzbek military leader
- Amir Kror Suri or Jahan Pahlawan (died 771 CE), a legendary Pashtun leader
- Pahlawan Mohanadas (fl. 1981–2004), head of Malaysian Armed Forces Health Services

== See also ==
- Pahlavan (disambiguation)
- Pehlivan (disambiguation)
- Palawan (disambiguation)
- Pahlavi (disambiguation)
- Parthia, a historical region located in north-eastern Iran
- Pehlwani, a form of wrestling
- Pahlwan, 2019 Indian wrestling film by S. Krishna
