= List of awards and honours received by Siti Hasmah =

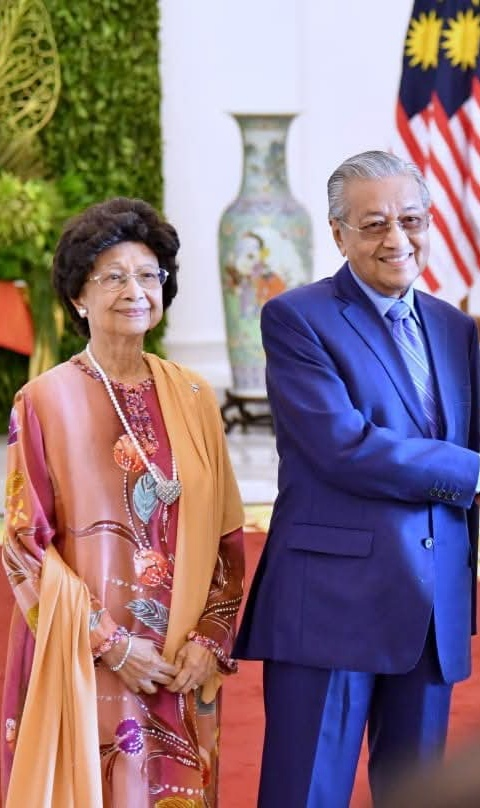
Siti Hasmah and Mahathir Mohamad

Siti Hasmah, the wife of Malaysia's fourth and seventh Prime Minister Mahathir Mohamad received numerous awards and honours in recognition of her service to the nation and beyond. The following is a list of awards and honours conferred upon her.

== Honours ==
=== Honours of Malaysia ===
- Malaysia
  - Grand Commander of the Order of Loyalty to the Crown of Malaysia (SSM) – Tun (2003)
  - Officer of the Order of the Defender of the Realm (KMN) (1975)
- Kedah
  - Knight Grand Companion of the Order of Loyalty to the Royal House of Kedah (SSDK) – Dato' Seri (1983)
  - Companion of the Order of the Crown of Kedah (SMK) (1971)
  - State of Kedah Distinguished Service Medal (PCK)
- Malacca
  - Knight Grand Commander of the Premier and Exalted Order of Malacca (DUNM) – Datuk Seri Utama (2003)
- Penang
  - Knight Grand Commander of the Order of the Defender of State (DUPN) – Dato' Seri Utama (2003)
- Sabah
  - Grand Commander of the Order of Kinabalu (SPDK) – Datuk Seri Panglima (1994)
- Sarawak
  - Knight Commander of the Order of the Star of Hornbill Sarawak (DA) – Datuk Amar (1995)
- Selangor
  - Knight Grand Commander of the Order of the Crown of Selangor (SPMS) – Datin Paduka Seri (1994, returned 2017)
  - Knight Commander of the Order of the Crown of Selangor (DPMS) – Datin Paduka (1983, returned 2017)

== Awards and recognitions ==
For her lifelong public service, voluntary work, and leadership in the fields of public health, literacy, and drug abuse control, Siti Hasmah received numerous awards.

On 21 January 1988, she was awarded the Kazue McLaren Award by the Asia Pacific Consortium for Public Health.

In 1991, Universiti Kebangsaan Malaysia conferred on her an Honorary Doctorate in medical science, followed by an Honorary Doctorate in Public Health from the Royal College of Physicians, Ireland in 1992.

In 1994, she received two honorary doctorates: an Honorary Doctorate of Humane Letters from Indiana University Bloomington in May and an Honorary Doctorate of Law from the University of Victoria, British Columbia, Canada in August.

On 18 August 1995, Siti Hasmah received an honorary Doctorate of Education from Universiti Malaya for her enormous and endless contributions in championing the cause of women in the country.

On 8 July 1996, Siti Hasmah conferred the Distinguished Paediatrics and Child Health Merit Award by the Malaysian Paediatric Association.

On 15 August 2002, Siti Hasmah was conferred the Companion of Honour award by the Malaysian Association of Chartered Institute of Marketing, its first woman recipient.

On 28 August 2003, Universiti Malaysia Sarawak (Unimas) awarded Siti Hasmah an honorary Doctorate in Science in recognition of her significant contributions to the nation, particularly in rural healthcare and women's empowerment.

On 15 January 2004, Siti Hasmah was awarded the Honorary Degree of Doctorate of Philosophy in Social Work, while her husband, Mahathir, received the Honorary Degree of Doctor of Letters.

On 14 February 2004, Siti Hasmah was honored with the Fellow Intan Award 2003 in recognition of her dedication to national and community development for over two decades.

On 20 June 2004, Siti Hasmah received well-deserved recognition for her contributions to Malaysian sports when the Olympic Council of Malaysia honored her with the Women and Sport Award for 2004.

On 27 April 2005, Siti Hasmah was honored as Ibu Idola (Ideal Mother) by the international cosmetics company Avon.

On 15 May 2006, Siti Hasmah was pleasantly surprised upon receiving the Hixson Fellowship Award, the highest recognition granted by the Kiwanis International Foundation.

On 3 October 2009, Siti Hasmah was awarded an honorary doctorate by Universiti Teknikal Malaysia Melaka (UTeM) for her contributions to national development, while Mahathir received the same honor.

On 7 October 2018, Perdana University awarded her an Honorary Doctor of Philosophy Degree for her contributions to women and community development.

On 13 November 2018, Siti Hasmah was honored with the Distinguished Alumni Service Award by the National University of Singapore (NUS), which recognized her as a “global icon to pioneer and inspire women worldwide”. At the same time, Singapore named an orchid hybrid, "Dendrobium Mahathir Siti Hasmah", in honor of Siti Hasmah and Mahathir's official visit.

On 29 December 2018, Siti Hasmah was honored with the Tokoh Srikandi Negara award at the Malaysian United Indigenous Party (Bersatu) general assembly in recognition of her contributions to the success of party chairman Mahathir. She was the first recipient of this award, which was accepted on her behalf by her son, Mukhriz Mahathir.

On 16 July 2019, she was honored with the Lifetime Achievement Award at the Asia Human Resource Development Awards for her contributions to Malaysia's public health sector, particularly her leadership in medical and social organizations, as well as her efforts in literacy and drug abuse control.

On 21 August 2019, Siti Hasmah was conferred the Ibu Negara (Mother of the Nation) award by the Asian Strategy and Leadership Institute (ASLI) for her contributions to nation-building, women's health, family planning, drug abuse control, and national unity.

On 18 December 2020, she was presented with the Nona Superwoman Award 2020 by Nona magazine, recognizing her impact as an inspirational female figure.

In addition, the Malaysian AIDS Foundation established the Dr Siti Hasmah Award in 1996 to recognize individuals and organizations whose work has made a significant impact on HIV/AIDS awareness and prevention in Malaysia. In March 2004, the Malaysian Agricultural Research and Development Institute (Mardi) introduced a new orchid hybrid named in honor of Siti Hasmah.

== Places named after her ==
Several places were named after her including:

- Bangunan BAKTI Siti Hasmah, a community centre in Changkat Abang Haji Openg, Taman Tun Dr Ismail, Kuala Lumpur.
- Rumah Insaniah Dr Siti Hasmah, a society for the rehabilitation of the disabled in Taman Kangapuram, Petaling Jaya, Selangor.
- Dewan Tun Dr Siti Hasmah, an event space auditorium at Rumah Puspanita, Kuala Lumpur.
- Tun Dr. Hasmah Mohd Ali Digital Library in Multimedia University (MMU), Melaka campus.
- Kompleks Penyayang Dr. Siti Hasmah, a welfare and community care complex located in Kampung Jejawi Utan Buluh, Arau, Perlis.

== See also ==
- List of awards and honours received by Mahathir Mohamad
