= PUSC =

PUSC may refer to:

- Pontifical University of the Holy Cross, a private Roman Catholic university in Rome, entrusted to the Prelature of the Holy Cross and Opus Dei
- Social Christian Unity Party (Partido Unidad Social Cristiana), a centre-right political party in Costa Rica

== See also ==
- PUScOT, School of Occupational Therapy of the Perdana University in Malaysia
