= Pehlivan (disambiguation) =

Pehlivan means hero or champion in Turkish, in the context of wrestling.

It may refer to:

- Pehlivan, Turkish surname
- Oil wrestlers
- Pehlivan (film), 1984 Turkish film

== See also ==
- Pehlivanlı (disambiguation)
- Pahlavan (disambiguation)
- Pahlawan (disambiguation)
- Pahlavi (disambiguation)
- Pelivan (disambiguation)
