= Pahlavi =

Pahlavi may refer to:

== Iranian royalty ==
- Seven Parthian clans, ruling Parthian families during the Sasanian Empire
- Pahlavi dynasty, the ruling house of Imperial State of Persia/Iran from 1925 until 1979
  - Reza Shah Pahlavi (1878–1944), Shah of Persia/Iran from 1925 to 1941
  - Hamdamsaltaneh Pahlavi (1903–1992), first child and daughter of Reza Shah
  - Shams Pahlavi (1917–1996), elder sister of Mohammad Reza Pahlavi
  - Mohammad Reza Pahlavi (1919–1980), Shah of Iran from 1941 to 1979
  - Ashraf Pahlavi (1919–2016), twin sister of Mohammad Reza Pahlavi
  - Ali Reza Pahlavi I (1922–1954), brother of Mohammad Reza Pahlavi, second son of Reza Shah
  - Gholamreza Pahlavi (1923–2017), half-brother of Mohammad Reza Pahlavi, last living child of Reza Shah
  - Abdul Reza Pahlavi (1924–2004), half-brother of Mohammad Reza Pahlavi
  - Fatimeh Pahlavi (1928–1987), Reza Shah's tenth child and half-sister of Mohammad Reza Pahlavi.
  - Hamid Reza Pahlavi (1932–1992), Reza Shah's eleventh and last born child, half-brother of Mohammad Reza Pahlavi.
  - Farah Pahlavi (born 1938), Shahbanu (Empress) of Iran, widow of Mohammad Reza Pahlavi
  - Shahnaz Pahlavi (born 1940), first child of Mohammad Reza Pahlavi and Fawzia Fuad Chirine
  - Patrick Ali Pahlavi (born 1947), nephew of Mohammad Reza Pahlavi, heir presumptive from 1954 to 1960
  - Reza Pahlavi II (born 1960), Crown Prince of Iran, eldest son of Mohammad Reza Pahlavi
  - Farahnaz Pahlavi (born 1963), first daughter of Mohammad Reza Pahlavi and Farah Pahlavi
  - Ali-Reza Pahlavi (1966–2011), younger son of Mohammad Reza Pahlavi and Farah Pahlavi, second in line to the throne.
  - Yasmine Pahlavi (born 1968), lawyer and the wife of Reza Pahlavi, the last crown prince of the former Imperial State of Iran

== Language and writing ==
- Parthian language or Arsacid Pahlavi, a now-extinct language spoken in Parthia, Iran
- Inscriptional Pahlavi, the earliest attested form of Pahlavi scripts
- Middle Persian, written in the Pahlavi script (including Zoroastrian Middle Persian of the 9th-11th century)
- Pahlavi scripts, as adopted to render various Middle Iranian languages
- Pahlavi literature, Persian literature of the 1st millennium AD
- Pahlavi Psalter, a 12-page non-contiguous section of a Middle Persian translation of a Syriac book of psalms
- Psalter Pahlavi, a cursive abjad which was used for writing Middle Persian, described as one of the Pahlavi scripts
- Book Pahlavi, more commonly used cursive Middle Iranian abjad, one of the Pahlavi scripts
- Fahlavīyāt or Pahlaviyat, poetry written in dialects of Pahla/Fahla region in western Iran, 9th–18th centuries AD

== Places ==
- Nanur (Pahlavi Dezh), a village in Nanur Rural District, Kurdistan Province, Iran
- Bandar-e Anzali, formerly Pahlavi, a port city in Gilan Province, Iran
- Pahlavi Mordab, a coastal lagoon in the Caspian Sea near Bandar-e Anzali
- Pahlavi Street, former name of Valiasr Street in Tehran, Iran

== Other uses ==
- Order of Pahlavi (Neshan-e Pahlavi), the highest order of the former Imperial State of Iran
- Pahlavi Crown, part of the coronation regalia used by the Pahlavi Shahs and part of the Iranian Crown Jewels
- Pahlavi hat, an item of headgear for men introduced by Reza Shah
- Pahlavi University or Shiraz University, a public university located in Shiraz, Iran
- Pahlavas, the Parthians in ancient Indian literature
  - Pahlava kingdom, their kingdom as known to the Indians

== See also ==
- Ali Reza Pahlavi (disambiguation)
- Pahlavan (disambiguation)
- Pahlawan (disambiguation)
- Pehlivan (disambiguation)
- Pahlavi family tree
- Pahlavism
- Reza Pahlavi (disambiguation)
- Parthia (disambiguation)
- Parthian (disambiguation)
- Pallavi (disambiguation)
