= Palawan (disambiguation) =

Palawan is a province in the Philippines.

Palawan may also refer to:

== Places ==
- Palawan (island), an island in Palawan province, Philippines
- Palawan State University, Philippines
- Pulau Palawan, or Palawan Island, an island south of Singapore

== Animals ==
- Palawan binturong
- Palawan fruit bat
- Palawan hornbill
- Palawan peacock-pheasant
- Palawan stink badger
- Palawan turtle

== Other uses ==
- Palawan people, indigenous ethnic group of the Palawan group of islands
- Palawan, common name in the Philippines of Cyrtosperma merkusii, the giant swamp taro
- Palawan Pawnshop, a non-banking financial services institution in the Philippines

== See also ==
- Pahlawan (disambiguation)
- Palawa (disambiguation)
- Palawano language
- Palauan (disambiguation)
- Pelalawan
