= Pehlivanlı =

Pehlivanlı can refer to:

- Pehlivanlı, Çankırı
- Pehlivanlı, Cide

== See also ==
- Pehlivan (disambiguation)
