= Perdana University-Royal College of Surgeons in Ireland School of Medicine =

Perdana University – Royal College of Surgeons in Ireland School of Medicine
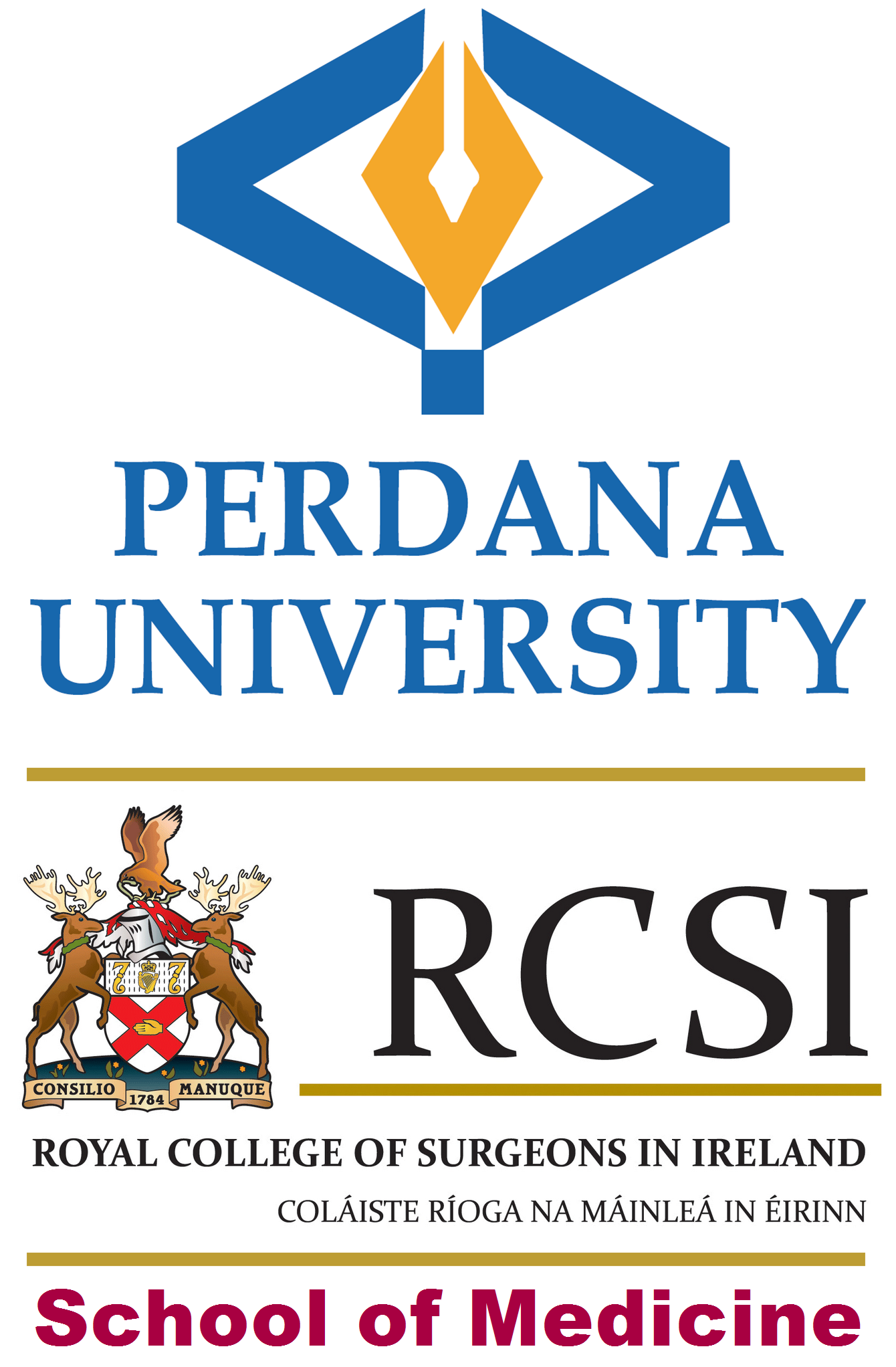
- Motto in English: “Perdana University – Where the past and the future is present”; RCSI "Leading the World to Better Health"
- Type: Private Medical School
- Established: 2011
- Affiliations: Perdana University; National University of Ireland; Royal College of Surgeons in Ireland
- Dean: Professor Raghu Varadarajan
- Undergraduates: 201
- Location: Damansara Heights, Kuala Lumpur, Malaysia; 3.1533553873376223°N 101.6663403384763°E
- Campus: Urban
- Colours: Perdana University – Orange and Blue ; RCSI – Red
- Website: www.perdanauniversity.edu.my

The Perdana University – Royal College of Surgeons in Ireland School of Medicine (commonly known as PU-RCSI or Perdana-RCSI) is one of the six schools of the Perdana University located in Damansara Heights, Kuala Lumpur. It was established in 2011 and closed in 2024.

The first batch of students was enrolled in 2011 and graduated in 2016. The dean was Professor Raghu Varadarajan, Consultant Surgeon prior to its closure.

== History ==
The opening of Perdana University and the medical programme was officiated by the former Prime Minister of Malaysia, Dato' Seri Najib Razak while the current Prime Minister of Malaysia, Tun Dr. Mahathir Mohamad was appointed as its Founding Chancellor. Current Chancellor is YBhg Tan Sri Datuk Seri Dr. Suleiman bin Mohamed

== Academic programmes ==
- Medical Degree Programme 5+0 in collaboration with the Royal College of Surgeons in Ireland. The School offers the same National University of Ireland degrees of MB BCh BAO and licentiateships LRCRSI and LRCPI as RCSI Dublin, but the licensed programme is completed wholly within Malaysia. Optional summer research and clinical electives can be arranged in Dublin and across Europe, for which scholarship funding is available. The two and a half year preclinical programme is provided at Perdana University's greenfield campus at MAEPS, Serdang, and includes early GP and Klinik Kesihatan patient contact from Semester 1 onwards. Clinical studies occupy the latter two and half years of the programme and are based at Hospital Kuala Lumpur, Hospital Putrajaya and Hospital Tuanku Ja'afar, Seremban as well as at Klang Valley GPs and at Klinik Kesihatan Cheras, Klinik Kesihatan Setapak and Klinik Kesihatan Kuala Lumpur.
- The programme is dually accredited by the Irish Medical Council (IMC) and the Malaysian Qualifications Agency (MQA) & Malaysian Medical Council (MMC). It is also recognised by the Medical Council of India (MCI). Applications are accepted from Malaysia, India, USA, Canada, Myanmar and Indonesia. Graduates who are not citizens of Malaysia are ineligible to enter pre-registration House Officer employment and must seek employment from their country of origin. Students are supported to prepare for the United States Medical Licensing Examination (USMLE), Professional and Linguistic Assessments Board (PLAB UK) and Pre-Registration Examination System (PRES Ireland) assessments.

== See also ==
- National University of Ireland
- Royal College of Surgeons in Ireland
- Royal College of Physicians of Ireland
