= Parthia (disambiguation) =

Parthia is a historical region located in northeastern Iran.

Parthia may also refer to:

- Parthian Empire, an empire ruled by Parthians
- Pahla, the late antique and post-Islamic region of the Parthians in Western Iran
- Parthia (horse), a thoroughbred racehorse
- Alternate form of Partita, a musical form
- Parthia (ship), two ships of the Cunard Line
- Parthia (moth) a genus of moths in the family Pyralidae

== See also ==
- Parthian (disambiguation)
- Pahlavi (disambiguation)
