= Palauan =

Palauan may refer to:

- Something of, from, or related to Palau
  - Palauan language, which originated in Palau, and its various dialects and accents
  - Palauan people, a nation and ethnic group identified with Palau

== See also ==
- Palawan (disambiguation)
