= Mohammed G A Al Maadheed =

Qatari physician

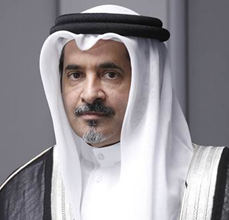

Mohammed G A Al Maadheed (Arabic: محمد غانم العلي المعاضيد) is a Qatari physician, retired general and writer. He is widely regarded as a pioneering figure in the development of the sports medicine field in Qatar. He has been involved in sports medicine projects in the country since 1991.

He has been vice president of the International Red Cross and Red Crescent Movement (IFRC) since 2009 and vice president of Qatar Red Crescent Society since 2005. He is also a member of the Medical Committee of FIFA, joining in 2010.

== Profile ==
Mohammed G.A. Al Maadheed is a leading thinker and practitioner in healthcare and sports medicine in the state of Qatar, and is the healthcare advisor to Sheikh Jassim Bin Hamad Al Thani, the personal representative of the Emir.

Over the last two decades, Al Maadheed has held and undertaken key leadership roles in Qatar's Healthcare. He serves as the vice chairperson, Supreme Council of Health and chairperson, executive committee, Supreme Council of Health (since 2014). He was appointed as the chairperson of the ‘Executive Group for a Healthy Population’ (2009-2010), which was tasked with the development of the Qatar National Health Strategy 2011–2016. He was vice chairperson of the executive committee of the Supreme Council of Health and a board member (2009-2014). Earlier to this, he was caretaker CEO of the National Health Authority, board member of the National Health Authority (2005-2008), and board member of Hamad Medical Corporation (1997-2006).

== Education ==
Al Maadheed attained his medical degree (MD) from the Royal College of Surgeons in Ireland (1987), a Masters in Epidemiology and Health Planning (1992) and a Ph.D. in Strategic Management in Healthcare (1996) from University of Wales, in Wales.

== Professional history ==
- The following tables show the professional history:

Institution	Detail of Postioion held	Dates
FIFA Medical Committee	Member	2010 - 2017
ASPETAR (Qatar Orthopedics and Sport Medicine Hospital, Qatar) recognized as Center of Excellence by FIFA (Feb 2009), IOC centre of Excellence for research	Director general (Established) & chairman ASPETAR scientific advisory	2005 - 2012
Asian Football Confederation (AFC)	Deputy chairman, AFC Medical committee	2011 - 2015
Asian Football Confederation (AFC)	Member, AFC Ad-Hoc Medical committee	2009 - 2011
Qatar Anti-Doping Lab Project Qatar	General Director	2008 - 2011
Qatar Military hospital Project, Qatar	General Director	2008 - 2011
Medical Committee, Olympic Council of Asia	Board Member	2002 - 2008
Qatar National Anti-Doping Commission	Founder & Chairperson	2005 - 2008
Regional Anti-Doping Organisation (Gulf & Yemen)	Founder	2005
Medical Commission, Olympic Council of Asia: Aomori Asian Winter Games, Japan Busan Asian Games, South Korea	Committee Member	2000 - 2006
Prepared the Asian Games (2006) Medical File for the Qatar Bid	Leader	2000
Scientific Commission, Asian Federation of Sport Medicine	Member	1996 - 1999
GCC Sport Medicine Committee	Chairperson	1995 - 1999
Sport Medicine Center, Qatar Olympic Committee	Founder & Managing Director	1992 - 1999

Institution	Detail of Postioion held	Dates
Supreme Conuncil of Health	Chairperson - Executive Committee	2014 - 2016
Supreme Conuncil of Health	Vice Chaiperson	2009 - 2014
Trauma Mass Casualty Hospital Project	Director General	2012 - 2015
RASAD	Chairman, International Advisory Board for Epidemiological Studies, RASAD	2012 - 2013
Naufar (Qatar addiction Treatment and Rehabilitation Center)	Project Director	2011 - 2017
Supreme Conuncil of Health	Board member	2009 - 2014
Supreme Conuncil of Health	Chairperson - Executive Group for a healthy population (Tasked with the development of Qatar national health strategy 2011–2016)	2009 - 2010
Qatar Red Crescent Society	president	2011 - 2020
International Federation of Red Cross and Red Crescent	Chairperson – Board Priorities Oversight Group	2012 – 2013
International Federation of Red Cross and Red Crescent	Vice President (Elected)	2009 - 2013
Qatar Red Crescent Society	Vice President	2008 – 2011
Human Rights Commission – Qatar	Board Member	2007 – 2011
National Health Authority, Qatar	Board Member	2005 - 2008
National Health Authority (Ministry of Health), Qatar	Caretaker CEO	2005 - 2006
Medical Committee, International Islamic University, Uganda	Honorary Member	2007
IFRC Constitution Review Committee	Member	2006 - 2007
Seville Agreement	Working Group Member	1997
Qatar Red Crescent Society	Secretary General	2000 - 2008
Hamad Medical Corporation, Qatar	Board Member	1997 - 2006
Qatar Armed Forces Medical Unit	Head, Surgical Section	1992 - 1999
Qatar Armed Forces Medical Unit	Assistant Commander	1992 - 1995
Ministerial Committee: Evaluation and Assessment of Hamad Medical Corporation	Member	1990

Institution	Detail of Position held	Dates
University College London (UCL) School of Life and Medical Sciences	Visiting Professor	2017 - 2020
Qatar International Development Fund	Board Member	2010 - ongoing
Qatar Fund for Social, Humanitarian & Sport Development	Board Member	2010 - 2016
Publication Series: Towards Humanitarian Education	Head, Editorial Team	2004 - 2008
Supreme Council of Environment	Board Member	2000 - 2004
Research committee for Centre of Futuristic Studies, Qatar	Chairman	1997 - 2000

== Career ==
Al Maadheed is an international thought leader in Sports Medicine and anti-doping fields. He established the first National Sports Medicine Centre in Qatar in 1992. He was instrumental in transforming the Vision for a comprehensive Sports Medicine facility into a new state-of-the-art and purpose-built Orthopedic and Sports Medicine Hospital as Director General of Aspetar (2003-2012). Aspetar attained international recognition when it was accredited as a FIFA Medical Centre of Excellence in 2009 and expanded its reach nationally into the Clubs and Federations of Qatar through the innovative National Sports Medicine Programme. Al Maadheed was also chairman of the Aspire Zone Research Committee.

Al Maadheed established and chaired the Qatar National Anti-doping Commission (2005-2008). He was the director general and project director of the Anti-doping Lab Qatar which was inaugurated in December 2012, and continues to provide stewardship as the chairman of the Board of Trustees and has been accredited by WADA in August 2015.

In the international sports medicine scene, he is a member on the FIFA Medical Committee (since 2009) and served as deputy chairman for the Asian Football Confederation (AFC) Medical Committee (2011 - 2015).

Al Maadheed is also the director general and project director of a new ‘greenfield’ state-of-the-art medical facility for addiction treatment and rehabilitation in Qatar (since 2010).

Al Maadheed was tasked to lead the Trauma and Mass Casualty Hospital Project and he served as the Director General of this project (2012-2015).

Al Maadheed served as the Chairman of the International Advisory Board for Epidemiological Studies for RASAD. Al Maadheed established RASAD as a commercial entity with contracts signed with Rome City Council, FASI and Harmoni. RASAD has been recognized as the first ‘Made-in-Qatar’ technology solution in domain outside of energy to be successfully commercialized internationally.

== Humanitarian work ==
Al Maadheed is active in the humanitarian fields and social missions. He is now President of the Qatar Red Crescent (QRC), and started his journey as its Secretary General (2000-2008). The QRC is an organisation providing relief to over 40 countries. He was elected and served as the vice-president of the International Federation of the Red Cross and Red Crescent for Asia (2009-2013). He was the Chair of the ‘Board Priorities Oversight Group’ for the International Federation of Red Cross and Red Crescent (2012-2013). He was board member of the Human Rights Commission of Qatar (2007-2011). He is also board member for Qatar International Development Fund and Qatar Fund for Social, Humanitarian & Sport Development and is on the World Economic for Middle East (since 2011).

Al Maadheed speaks frequently internationally on different humanitarian issues and has been honoured by numerous organisations worldwide. He has also authored multiple articles and papers and has written and published on the subject of human dignity and other humanitarian issues.

== Prizes, awards and other honours ==
The following tables show the Prizes, Awards and other Honours:

Award	Awarding body	Year
Keys of the City	Gorée Island, Dakar, Senegal	2020
Honorary Citizenship	Chinguetti, Mauritania	2019
Swiss Business Community Award	Doha, Qatar	2018
The WISH Oxford Series Healthcare in Conflict Zones: Delivering effective Solutions	Harris Manchester College, University of Oxford, UK	2018
Person of the Year 2017 Field of International Peace	Qatar Youth Hostels	2017
Presidential Medal for Social Responsibility	Sudan	2016
1st AFC Medical Award	Asian Football Confederation	2015
Honorary Passport, Corporate Social Responsibility, International Ambassador	United Nations	2014
Medal of Honor	Algerian Red Crescent Society	2012
Personality of the year for contribution to Sports Medicine	Qatar Olympic Committee	2010
Medal of Honor	Venezuelan Red Cross Society	2009
Medal of Honor	Italian Red Cross Society	2007
Recognition for Contribution to Healthcare of Gulf Countries	Gulf Cooperation Council	2004

== Projects and grants ==
Centre of Metabolism & Inflammation (CoMI)

Appointed as Director of the centre Feb 2020, which is part of the Research Department of Inflammation, Division of Medicine, UCL. Involved in the conception, planning, obtaining funding, staffing and supervision of two major programmes of research within the centre.

1) Investigation of non-communicable diseases in low/middle income communities.

South Asians (individuals from India, Pakistan, Nepal, Bangladesh, and Sri Lanka), who represent a quarter of the world's population, along with Arabs and Africans, account for 60% of the world's heart disease patients. This includes cardiomyopathies and aggressive atherosclerotic cardiovascular disease. This is an area of intense current public scrutiny, especially in relation to low/ middle income blue collar workers who are residents in the Gulf Cooperation Countries (GCC), where there are significant opportunities for employment, particularly from the surrounding countries of the Indian sub-continent, due to their immense infrastructure building projects. Data suggests that the prevalence of NCDs is high in these workers, but perhaps comparable to that seen amongst the host (Qatari) population and to the workers’ countries of origin (e.g. India, Nepal, Bangladesh). Young people from these ethnicities, especially men, with moderate-to-severe structural heart abnormalities are found to be asymptomatic and have no clinical signs, with the first indication often being sudden cardiac death. A screening programme including extensive clinical information, including ECG, and multi-omics data, is likely to predict subjects with ‘silent’ underlying heart disease. Timely disqualification from strenuous occupations and moderate behavioral changes could be life-saving, especially on building sites in Qatar.

Study 1. Set-up, obtained funding (QRCS internal grant £150,000), supervised and completed a pilot study of 58,270 blue collar, male workers from low/middle income communities, resident in Qatar, looking at the association between their length of stay with the diagnosis of NCDs, using a descriptive, retrospective model, including basic demographics. Eighty-three percent of the population were between the ages of 25 – 55 years and predominantly from the Indian sub-continent, accounting for 90%. The majority (84.5%) of this population had also been resident in Qatar for 3 or more years, with greater than 96% of the studied population having been resident in Qatar for more than 12 months. The top reasons for visits to the clinic were due to hypertension, dyslipidaemia and/or diabetes, and associated with multiple visits to the clinic, requiring chronic treatment and monitoring.

Study 2. To further study NCDs within this poorly studied population, obtained funding (£2.0 million) from Supreme Committee for Delivery & Legacy Qatar 2022 for the screening of 20,000 male, low middle income blue collar workers, registered at the QRCS clinics. The parameters screened for were medical history, complete and comprehensive medical screening, including ECG, routine laboratory investigations and blood collections. This comprehensive, clinical database has been quality checked. Samples from these subjects have been stored for omics studies, including serum and whole blood for DNA extraction. The screening was approved by a nationally registered Institutional Review Board and all subjects provided written consent. Currently DNA has been extracted from a representative sub-group (n=8,000) of these subjects, and passed quantitative and qualitative quality control measures. In view of the enormity of the undertaking the analysis will be done in stages, with an optimum of 5,000 (minimum n=1,000) samples, being analysed at each stage, until all the 20,000 samples have been completed. We aim to carry out multi-omics analyses (whole genome sequencing, proteomics and metabolomics) on this sub-group in collaboration with institutions based in Qatar and various collaborators at UCL.

Funding application – awaiting outcome (end August 2021). Funding for the initial omics analyses has been applied for (£6 million over 3 years) from Qatar Foundation. As the analysis progresses and the numbers increase beyond n=5,000 this is likely to attract industry partners interested in using this information to gain insights into the evolving area of genome science, with a view to identifying new genes and biomarkers which could lead the development of innovative diagnostics and treatments tailored to these ethnicities and communities.

The mission of the center is to contribute to the health of populations from low/middle income communities by investigating the burden of non-communicable diseases (NCDs) on them and tailoring diagnostics and therapeutics based on these findings.

2) Generation of dromedary camel V_{H}H fragments for therapeutics and diagnostics of inflammatory diseases.

Development of camelid V_{H}Hs for use in diagnostics and as drugs has generated much recent interest. Recently (2014–present), publications have continued to grow and more V_{H}Hs have entered into clinical trials or advanced closer to the market. The first V_{H}H-based drug (Caplacizumab; bivalent anti-vWF nanobody for treating rare blood clotting disorders) reached the market in February 2019 (www.ablynx.com). Meanwhile, IP limitations on V_{H}Hs are diminishing and more biotechnology companies are showing interest in commercialization of these domain antibodies as therapeutics, diagnostics, and research reagents.

Funding for setting up platform (2016 – ongoing). Secured funding, identified staffing and established a platform for producing V_{H}H fragments in Doha, using the available technology. Over the past three years, the platform has developed several leads, directed against various immunomodulatory targets.

Private funding. A funding (£2 million) application has been submitted to private venture capitalists for the camel antibody platform. Three rounds of successful review have been completed and the outcome should be received by the end of August 2021.

Currently, CoMI is in the process of being recognized as operating on two sites, one based at the Royal Free Campus, London (CoMI-R) and the other in Doha, Qatar, in allocated premises within the building of the Anti-Doping Lab Qatar (ADLQ), CoMI-Q.

Qatar Red Crescent Society (QRCS)

Joined as CEO in 2001 with a budget of £1,000,000, operating only within Qatar, with 25 staff members. In 2020, stepped down as president, with a budget of £250,000,000, and 2,500 staff (1000 in Qatar and 1,500 internationally). As CEO, was in charge of building up the organisation, setting strategy, execution and raising of funds locally and internationally. In addition, the humanitarian activities of QRCS has impacted the lives of 13 million people in 2020, including the provision of primary healthcare for 1.2 million people within Qatar.

ASPETAR, Qatar Orthopedics and Sports Medicine Hospital

Was Director General from 2000 to 2012, in charge of 700 staff with projects value of £100,000,000, and a yearly budget of £80,000,000

Developed the concept, terms of reference, models of care delivery and all other aspects of setting up until commissioning. Was further recognised as a Centre of Excellence for sports medicine by FIFA and more recently a Centre of Research Excellence for pain management in athletes by the International Olympic Committee (IOC).

The concept of the facility and model of care was the first of its kind globally, specialising in sports medicine.

Anti-Doping Lab Qatar

Was Director General of the project (2008) until it opened 2012. Developed the concept, obtained governmental funding and political support from Gulf Cooperation Countries to be the west Asian regional laboratory. Became the Chair of Board of Trustees in 2012, overseeing an annual budget of £30,000,000. The lab was internationally accredited for testing elite, competing athletes for prohibited sport performance-enhancing substances by the World Anti-Doping Agency in 2015.

Naufar (Qatar Addiction Treatment and Rehabilitation Centre)

Is Director General of a rehabilitation centre for substance use disorders. First of its kind in Qatar. The total cost of the project was £170,000,000, with an annual budget of £80,000,000. In 2018 the hospital gained accreditation by the Commission on Accreditation of Rehabilitation Facilities (CARF).
