= Parthia (ship) =

SS or RMS Parthia may refer to one of three Cunard ships, named after the historic region of Parthia:

- SS Parthia (1870) was an iron hulled steamer launched in 1870. She was transferred to John Elder & Co. in 1883, and to the Guion Line in 1884, who renamed her Victoria.
- RMS Parthia (1947) was a passenger/cargo liner launched in 1947, sold to the New Zealand Shipping Company in 1961 and renamed Remuera, and then to the Eastern and Australia Steamship Company and renamed Aramac in 1964, scrapped in 1970.
- Rice Trader (1963), cargo ship, sold to Stateships in 1971 and renamed, scrapped in 1984

== See also ==
- Parthia (disambiguation)
