= Anupallavi =

Anupallavi may refer to:

- Anupallavi (music), a term in Carnatic music
- Anupallavi (film) a 1979 Indian Malayalam film

== See also ==
- Pallavi (disambiguation)
