= Parthian =

Parthian may refer to:

== Historical ==
- Parthian people
- A demonym "of Parthia", a region of north-eastern of Greater Iran
- Parthian Empire (247 BC – 224 AD)
- Parthian language, a now-extinct Middle Iranian language
- Parthian shot, an archery skill famously employed by Parthian horsemen
- Pahlavas, the Parthians in ancient Indian literature
  - Pahlava kingdom, their kingdom as known to the Indians

== Other uses ==
- Parthian Books, a Welsh publishing house
- Indo-Parthian kingdoms
- Parthian-class submarine
- Seven Parthian clans

== See also ==
- Parthia (disambiguation)
- Pahlavi (disambiguation)
