= Palawa, Alwar =

Palawa is a census village in Mumdawar tehsil of the Alwar district in the Indian state of Rajasthan. It is located 64 km from Alwar and 149 km from the State capital of Jaipur

Its Palawa Pin code is 301706 and postal head office is Shahjahanpur.

== Demographics of Palawa ==
Palawa is surrounded by Kishangarh Bas Tehsil towards the east, Nimrana Tehsil towards the west, Bawal Tehsil and Kotkasim Tehsil towards the North.

Bawal, Alwar, Rewari, Narnaul are the nearby Cities to Palawa. It is on the border of the Alwar District and the Rewari District.

Rajasthani is the Local Language here.

Time zone: IST (UTC+5:30) Elevation / Altitude: 284 meters. Above Sea level Telephone Code / Std Code: 01495

== Schools in Palawa ==
- Govt. Ups(snskrit) Palawa
- Jupiter Ups Pubsch Palawa
- Shri Krisan Pub. Sch. Palawa
- Govt. Prvesika. Ss Palawa
- Govt. Ss Palawa
