= Pelivan (disambiguation) =

Pelivan is a commune in Moldova. Pelivan may also refer to

- Pelivan, Belgrade, a pastry shop in Belgrade, Serbia
- Dominik Pelivan (born 1996), German-Croatian football midfielder
- Ion Pelivan
- Jure Pelivan (1928–2014), Bosnian Croat politician and economist
