= Abhishek Pallava =

Indian police officer

Dr. Abhishek Pallava IPS
- Born: 2 September 1982 (age 43); Begusarai, Bihar, India
- Education: Goa Medical College, AIIMS New Delhi
- Spouse: Dr. Yasha
- Police career
- Country: India
- Service years: 2013-present
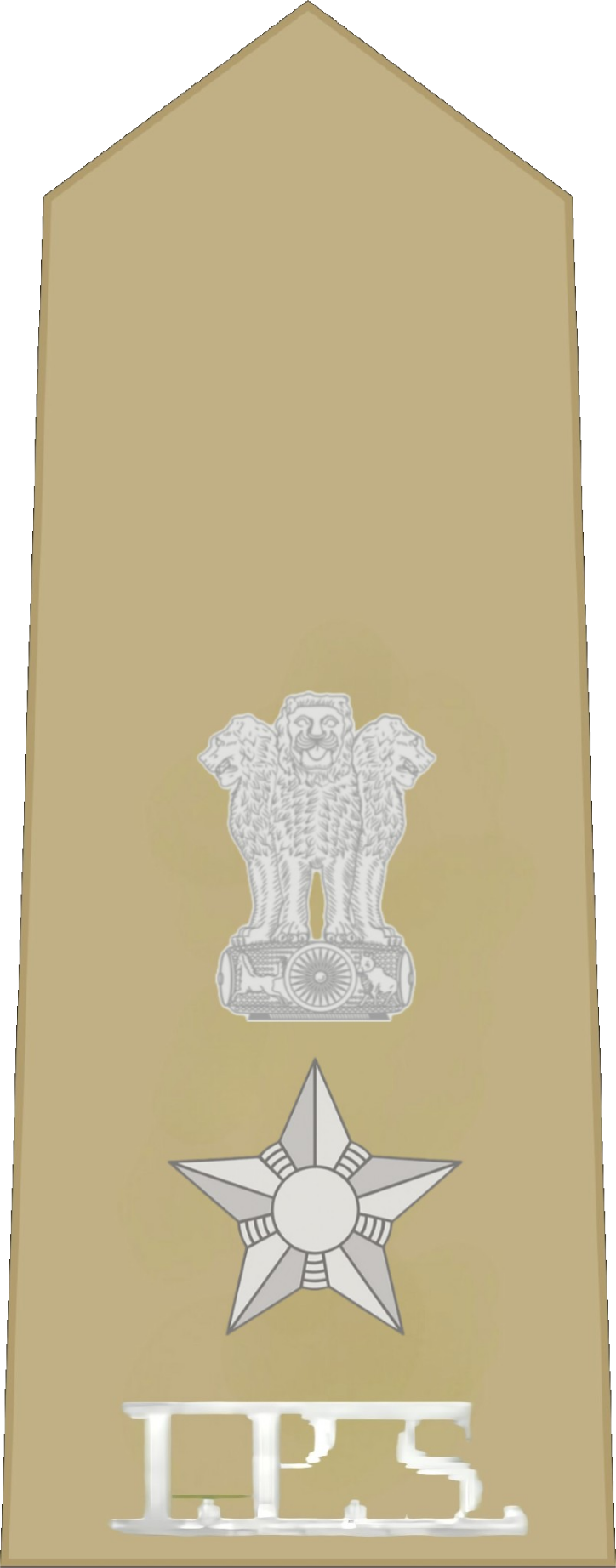
- Rank: Superintendent of Police
- Batch: 2013
- Cadre: Chhattisgarh

Abhishek Pallava (born 2 September 1982) is an Indian Police Service officer of the 2013 batch, from the Chhattisgarh cadre, who is currently serving as the Superintendent of Police of Kabirdham, Chhattisgarh.

== Early life ==
Abhishek Pallava was born to Mr. Rishi Kumar and Mrs. Asha Devi in Begusarai. He joined the Indian Police Service, in 2013, through the UPSC Civil Service Examination, 2012.

== Police career ==
Mr. Pallava was appointed as the SP of Dantewada in 2018 where he came into the limelight when he treated a follower of maoism, whom he had shot himself. He also treats ailing people from the interior villages.

== Personal life ==
He is married to Dr. Yasha, who is a dermatologist, from Durg, Bhillai.
