= Royal College of Surgeons in Ireland =

Irish medical school

- Coláiste Ríoga na Máinleá in Éirinn
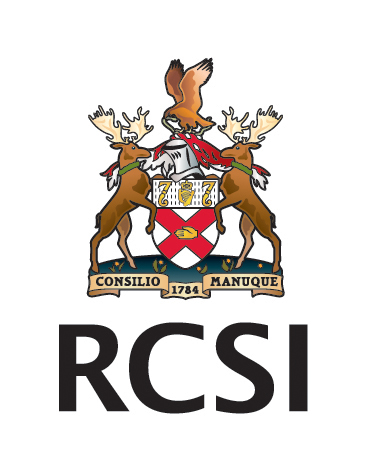
- Motto: Consilio Manuque (By Advice and by Hand)
- Type: Medical school and medical royal college
- Established: 11 February 1784
- Affiliations: NUI
- President: Michael Kerin
- Vice-president: David Moore
- Vice-Chancellor: Cathal Kelly
- Students: 4,094 (as of 2020)
- Location: 123 St Stephen's Green, Dublin, D02 YN77, Ireland; 53°20′21″N 6°15′45″W
- Campus: Urban
- Language: English
- Colors
- Nickname: Surgeons
- Website: rcsi.com

- Location within Central Dublin

The Royal College of Surgeons in Ireland (RCSI), also known as RCSI University of Medicine and Health Sciences, is a medical school and professional body based in Ireland. It was established in 1784 as the national body for the surgical branch of medicine in Ireland, with a role in supervision of training, and as of 2021 provides a broad range of medical education in multiple countries.

RCSI's main campus is situated on St. Stephen's Green and York Street in central Dublin and incorporates schools of medicine, pharmacy and biomolecular sciences, physiotherapy, population health, dentistry and nursing and midwifery. It offers undergraduate and postgraduate education in a number of healthcare fields.

RCSI was ranked first in the world for SDG3 Good Health and Well-being in the Times Higher Education Impact Rankings 2025.

== History ==
=== Background and foundation ===
Since the Middle Ages, the practice of surgery in Dublin was licensed by one of the Guilds of the City of Dublin, the Barber-Surgeons' Guild, also known at times as the Guild of St. Mary Magdalene. The guild chapel was in Christ Church. Guild membership was obtained by a three-year apprenticeship, followed by two years as a journeyman. The College of Surgeons maintained a mandatory period of apprenticeship to become a qualified surgeon until 1828.

In 1446, the Barber-Surgeons' Guild was incorporated by a royal decree of Henry VI, becoming the first medical corporation in Britain or Ireland.

In 1765 Sylvester O'Halloran, a surgeon from Limerick, proposed a College of Surgeons along the lines of the College de St. Cosme in Paris, which had been regulating French surgeons since its creation by a Royal Charter by King Louis IX in 1255, to train and regulate surgeons. The Dublin Society of Surgeons was founded in 1780 at the Elephant public house on Essex Street (now Parliament Street).

Trinity College Dublin, did not teach surgery as a subject until 1851, so in the 18th century Ireland was without a school focused on surgery. To have a separate organization providing standardised surgical education became one of the goals of the new Society of Surgeons, and it lobbied for a Royal Charter, in 1781 presenting the Lord Lieutenant a petition to be incorporated separately from the barbers. The awaited charter was granted by King George III on 11 February 1784. The governing body, including the first President, Samuel Croker-King, and William Dease, first professor of surgery, met in the boardroom of the Rotunda Hospital for the first time on 2 March 1784.

==== Non-discrimination ====
At the time of the Protestant Ascendancy, the admission or employment of surgeons was not subject to discrimination on sectarian grounds. Two of the RCSI's leading founders, Sylvester O'Halloran and William Dease, as well as eleven of its first 57 presidents, were Roman Catholics. From 1856, the college also recognized the medical qualifications given by the Catholic University which gave more weight to its own diplomas.

=== 18th and 19th centuries ===
The first candidate for examination was John Birch, in August 1784.

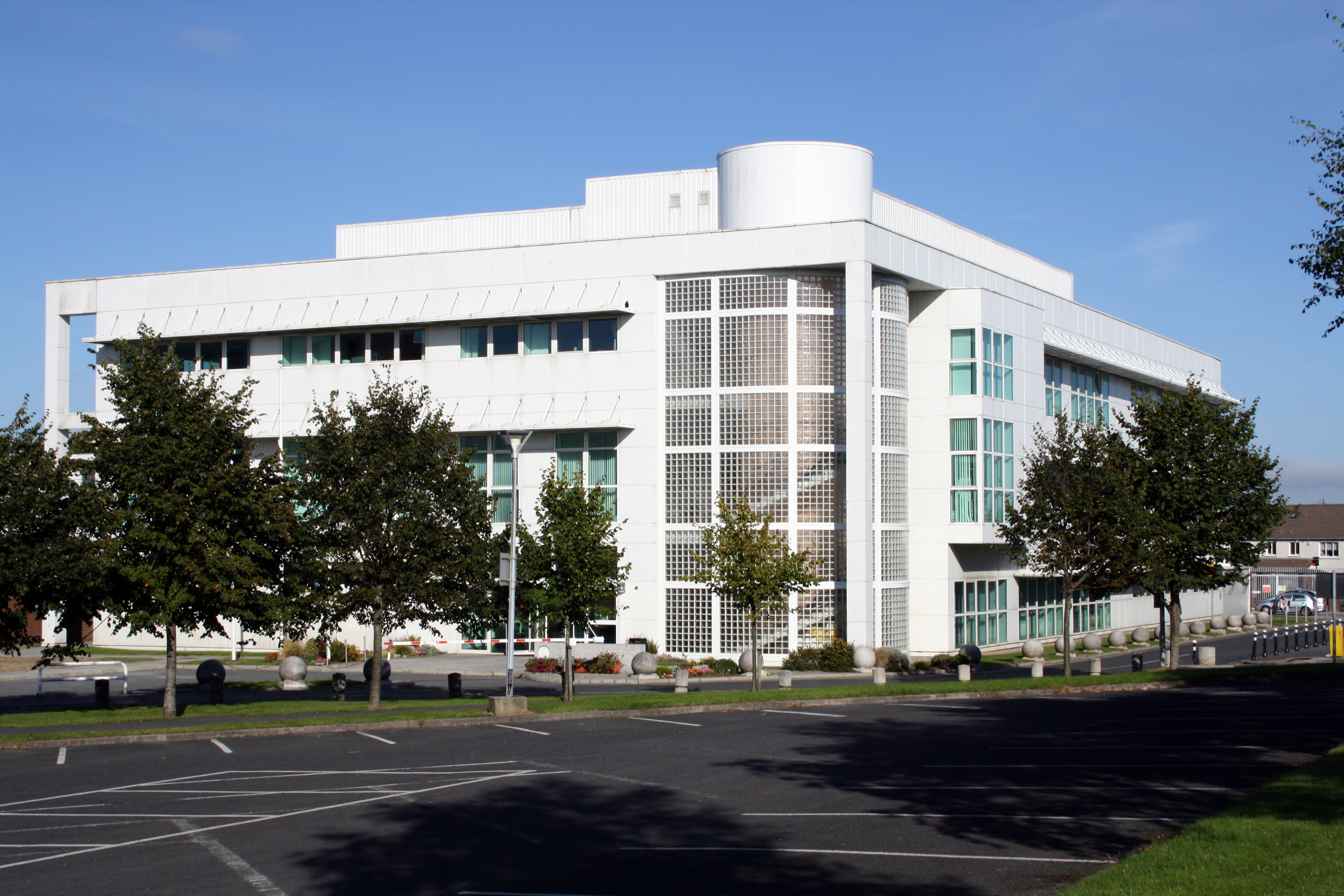
The RCSI Disease and Research centre in Beaumont Hospital

The RCSI's first home, at the corner of York Street, was acquired in September 1805, with additional land at Glover's Alley bought in 1809. The site was previously an abandoned Quaker burial ground. John Russell, 6th Duke of Bedford, laid the foundation stone of the new building on St. Patrick's Day, 1806, and this reached completion in March 1810. As of 2021, it remains the primary location of the college.

A supplemental charter was granted by Queen Victoria in 1844, dividing medical graduates into Licentiates and Fellows. Initially, physicians were trained alongside surgeons. In 1886 these two disciplines were merged, and the medical school began operation. As a result of this historical legacy, graduates of medicine still receive Licentiate diplomas from the two Royal Colleges as well as now being awarded MB (Bachelor of Medicine) BCh (Bachelor of Surgery) and BAO (Bachelor of the Art of Obstetrics) degrees by the National University of Ireland.

Now defunct subjects formerly taught include: Logic (1852–1862), Military Surgery (1851–1860) and botany (1792–1889).

In 1885, the RCSI became the first medical school in Ireland to admit women to its classes. The first woman to qualify as a fellow of the RCSI was Emily Winifred Dickson in 1893 and the second Mary Strangman in 1902.

=== 20th century ===
During the 1916 Rising, the main college building on St Stephen's Green was occupied by Irish Citizen Army forces, led by Commandant Michael Mallin and Countess Markievicz. After surrendering, both were tried and sentenced to death. Mallin was executed while Markievicz's sentence was commuted due to her gender.

The subject Hygiene or Political Medicine (1841–1921) was retired, and its Chair united with Medical Jurisprudence.

The RCSI became the first medical institution of learning to offer a 4-year graduate entry programme for medicine in Ireland.

Ethna Gaffney became the first female professor at RCSI in 1967.

=== 21st century ===
During the period 2014 – 2018, RCSI-affiliated researchers collaborated with over 2,100 international academic and industry institutions producing over 2,900 co-authored publications. The university's field-weighted citation impact is twice the world average and scores in the top decile internationally in the Times Higher Education World University Ranking (2020).

In December 2019, the RCSI was authorised as a university, becoming the ninth in Ireland, following a change in legislation, and an application by the college. The long-sought change in status was complicated by the RCSI's status as a private body but eventually a standard process was created and the college met the conditions set out in it, and following ministerial approval, the change was endorsed by votes in both houses of the Oireachtas. This also made it the eleventh university on the island of Ireland, including The Queen's University of Belfast and Ulster University.

== Associated hospitals ==
Since the 1980s Beaumont Hospital, Dublin has been the principal centre for medical training. Other affiliated hospitals include teaching hospitals such as Connolly Hospital, Royal Victoria Eye and Ear Hospital, St. Joseph's Hospital, Dublin and University Hospital Waterford.

== Academics ==
The institution has a structure of Faculties and Schools, some parts of which focus more on undergraduate studies, some more on post-graduate and continuing professional education.

Medical graduates typically receive MB BCh BAO (Bachelor of Medicine, Bachelor of Surgery, and Bachelor of the Art of Obstetrics) degree from the National University of Ireland (NUI), alongside professional licentiate diplomas.

== International aspects and operations ==
Rankings
Global rankings
- ARWU (2026): 901−1000
- THE (2026): 251−300

The RCSI is active in medically related sectors of education in multiple locations. During the South African Apartheid, for example, the RCSI provided medical education to those that were discriminated against. More than 95 countries from each continent are represented in the RCSI student body.

RCSI-Bahrain had Bachelor of Medicine (MB, BCh, BAO) programme, a 4-year Bachelor of Science in Nursing programme and a 2-year research based Master of Science in Nursing programme.

== Notable alumni ==
- Professor Abraham Colles of Anatomy, the first person to characterise the injury that was later on known as Colles' fracture
- Felipe Contepomi, former Argentina rugby union international.
- Surgeon Captain Thomas Joseph Crean VC DSO (1873 to 1923), who later achieved the rank of Major.
- Baron Darzi of Denham, Professor of Surgery, Imperial College London, and formerly the British Parliamentary Under-Secretary of State for Health
- Sir Alexander Dempsey, M.D. FRSM, JP, physician, hospital administrator and magistrate.
- Emily Winifred Dickson (13 July 1866 – 1944), the first woman Fellow of any Royal College of Surgeons in Ireland or Great Britain
- Patrick Dignan, major general, director of army surgery, British Army, between 1973 and 1978.
- Sir Ian Fraser (1901–1999), president of the college and president of the British Medical Association, who introduced the widespread use of penicillin into military hospitals during the Second World War
- Nada Haffadh, Bahrain's first female minister when she was appointed Minister of Health in 2004
- Ravi Kant, professor of surgery, Padma Shri award winner(2016) and vice chancellor of King George's Medical University, Lucknow, India.
- Mohammed G A Al Maadheed, physician
- Karl Mullen, Irish Rugby Union player and captain of the Grand Slam-winning Irish team in 1948
- Pat O'Callaghan, Irish gold medallist at both the 1928 and 1932 Olympic Games
- Ian Robertson, former star of the Dublin gaelic football team
- Sir William Stokes, knighted for his contribution in the field of surgery.
- Wan Azizah Wan Ismail, MacNaughton-Jones Gold Medal for Obstetrics and Gynecology in 1977; First female Malaysia's Deputy Prime Minister and Spouse to Malaysia's 10th Prime Minister
- Sir William Wilde, surgeon, author and father of Oscar Wilde
- T.G. Wilson, President of the RCSI (1958–61), author, founder of the Journal of the College (1963)
- George Magoha, cabinet secretary of education kenya and vice chancellor Nairobi university.

== Notable honorary fellows ==
- Robert Adair (1784)
- Benjamin Bell (1784)
- Percivall Pott (1788, posthumous)
- John Hunter (1790)
- John Abernethy, Astley Cooper, Antonio Scarpa, Samuel Thomas von Sömmerring (1821)
- Georges Cuvier (1831)
- Friedrich Tiedemann (1836)
- Benjamin Collins Brodie (1838)
- Richard Owen (1849)
- William Bowman (1867)
- Samuel Haughton (1873)
- Hermann von Helmholtz (1881)
- Louis Pasteur, Joseph Lister, Thomas Henry Huxley, James Paget, Thomas Spencer Wells (1886)
- John Eric Erichsen, Jonathan Hutchinson (1887)
- Thomas Heazle Parke (1889)
- John Shaw Billings, Hermann Snellen (1892)
- Thomas Joseph Crean (1902)
- Anthony Traill (1905)
- Henri Hartmann, Alfred Henry Keogh, Almoth Edward Wright (1906)
- William Macewen (1912)
- Berkley Moynihan (1913)
- Harvey Cushing (1918)
- Arthur William Patrick Albert (1919)
- William Mayo and Charles Mayo, William Williams Keen (1921)
- Alfred Webb-Johnson (1948)
- Cecil Pembrey Grey (1954)
- Seán T. O'Kelly (1958)
- Benjamin Guinness (1961)
- Éamon de Valera, Arthur Porritt (1964)
- Michael Ellis De Bakey (1967)
- Bryan Guinness, Walter Mackenzie (1968)
- Denis Parsons Burkitt, Francis Daniels Moore (1973)
- Cearbhall O'Dalaigh (1975)
- J. Hartwell Harrison, M.D. (1976)
- Patrick Hillery (1977)
- Robert B. Salter (1978)
- John W. Kirklin (1979)
- Daoud Hanania (1980)
- Abdullah bin Abdulaziz Al Saud (1988)
- Sultan Azlan Shah of Perak (1991)
- Mahathir Mohamad (1991), former Prime Minister of Malaysia
- Mary Robinson (1994), former President of Ireland
- Emir Shaikh Isa bin Sulman Al Khalifa (1995)
- Mother Teresa of Calcutta (1995)
- Nelson Mandela (1996)
- Alfred Cuschieri (1996), professor
- Seamus Heaney (1998)
- Mary McAleese (1998), former President of Ireland
- Sultan Azlan Shah The Yang Di Pertuan Agong IX (2000)
- Sheikh Maktoum bin Rashid Al Maktoum (2004)
- Bertie Ahern (2006), former Taoiseach
- Bob Geldof (2007)
- Jimmy Carter (2007), former US President
- Joe Schmidt (2019), New Zealand rugby union coach

== Honorary degrees ==
The RCSI was granted independent degree-awarding status by the Irish government in 2010, which also allowed the then college, now university, to award honorary degrees. Among others, the following individuals have received honorary doctorates from the RCSI.

- 2011: Mary McAleese, President of Ireland (1997–2011)
- 2013: The Baron Darzi of Denham, FRCSI, surgeon and former British health minister
- 2014: Abraham Verghese - Doctor of Science, professor at Stanford University School of Medicine
- 2016: Nezam H. Afdhal, Chief of Hepatology and Director of the Liver Center, Beth Israel Deaconess Medical Centre, Boston and Professor of Medicine, Harvard Medical School; RCSI Class of 1981
- 2017: Bennet Omalu, forensic pathologist/neuropathologist, Chief Medical Examiner for San Joaquin County, California, and Clinical Professor of Medical Pathology and Laboratory Medicine, University of California at Davis
- 2018: Barbara Murphy, Murray M. Rosenberg Professor of Medicine, Dean for Clinical Integration and Population Health, Icahn School of Medicine at Mount Sinai, New York; RCSI Class of 1989
- 2018: Siddhartha Mukherjee, Associate Professor of Medicine, Columbia University Medical Centre, New York
- 2019: Sally Davies, Chief Medical Officer for England and Chief Medical Advisor to the UK Government Department of Health and Social Care; professor
- 2019: Garret A. FitzGerald, physician and professor at the Perelman School of Medicine of the University of Pennsylvania
- 2020: Richard Horton, Editor-in-Chief and Publisher of The Lancet
- 2021: Martin Seligman, Zellerbach Family Professor of Psychology and Director of the Positive Psychology Center at the University of Pennsylvania; founder of Positive Psychology as a field of scientific study

== Arms ==
Coat of arms of Royal College of Surgeons in Ireland
Notes Granted by Sir Arthur Vicars, Ulster King of Arms, 20 March 1907. Crest On a wreath of the colours an eagle preying on a serpent Proper. Escutcheon Argent on a saltire Gules a dexter hand apoumée fesswise couped at the wrist Proper on a chief Ermine a harp crowned between two fleams Or. Supporters Two Irish elks each gorged with a chaplet of shamrocks all Proper. Motto Consilio Manuque

== See also ==
- Faculty of Dentistry of the Royal College of Surgeons in Ireland
- Irish College of Ophthalmologists
- Perdana University Royal College of Surgeons in Ireland
- Royal College of Surgeons of England
