= Pahlavan, Iran =

Pahlavan پهلوان
- Village
- Location within Iran
- Coordinates: 36°26′54″N 47°04′12″E
- Country: Iran
- Province: West Azerbaijan
- County: Takab
- Bakhsh: Central
- Rural District: Karaftu

Population (2006)
  - Total: 10
- Time zone: UTC+3:30 (IRST)
  - Summer (DST): UTC+4:30 (IRDT)

Pahlavan (Persian: پهلوان, also Romanized as Pahlavān) is a village in Karaftu Rural District, in the Central District of Takab County, West Azerbaijan Province, Iran. At the 2006 census, its population was 10, in 10 families.
