= Ali Reza Pahlavi =

Ali Reza Pahlavi, Ali-Reza Pahlavi, or Alireza Pahlavi may refer to:

- Ali Reza Pahlavi (1922–1954), a member of the Pahlavi imperial family, who died in a plane crash
- Ali Reza Pahlavi (1966–2011), a member of the Pahlavi imperial family, who committed suicide
