= Pallavi (given name) =

Pallavi is an Indian feminine given name that may refer to

- Pallavi (actress), Indian actress and producer
- Pallavi Aiyar, Indian journalist and author
- M. D. Pallavi Arun, Indian singer
- Pallavi Gungaram (born 1993), Mauritian beauty pageant titleholder
- Pallavi Joshi, Indian actress and model
- Pallavi Kulkarni, Indian television actress
- Pallavi Purohit, Indian actress
- Pallavi Ramisetty, Indian actress
- Pallavi Seshayyar (1842–1909), composer of Carnatic music
- Pallavi Sharda, Indian-Australian actress and dancer
- Pallavi Subhash, Indian soap opera actress
- Pallavi Subhash Chandran, Indian television actress
