= Perdana University =

Private university in Malaysia

- Motto in English: “Where the past and the future is present”
- Type: Private
- Established: 2011; 15 years ago
- Affiliations: National University of Ireland; Royal College of Surgeons in Ireland
- Vice-Chancellor: Datuk Ts. Dr. Mohd Razali bin Muhamad
- Pro-Chancellor: Tan Sri Datuk Dr. Mohan Swami
- Location: Perdana University, Suite 5.3 (5th Floor), Wisma Chase Perdana, Changkat Semantan, Damansara Heights, 50490 Kuala Lumpur, Malaysia; 3.1533553873376223°N 101.6663403384763°E
- Campus: Urban
- Colours: Orange and Blue
- Nickname: PU
- Website: www.perdanauniversity.edu.my

Perdana University (PU), is private university located in Kuala Lumpur, Malaysia, focusing on health science and data science programmes at foundation (pre-university), undergraduate and postgraduate levels. Perdana University was officially incorporated in 2011. In 2017, Perdana University was awarded Tier 4: Very Good in the Rating System for Malaysian Higher Education 2017 (SETARA) from the Ministry of Higher Education Malaysia (MOHE).

The University took in its very first students in 2011 with the opening of the PU-RCSI School of Medicine and Graduate School of Medicine. At present, the University consists of 6 Schools and 2 Centres. The School of Business is the latest school formed recently.

The main campus of PU located in MAEPS, Serdang, Selangor has been relocated to Wisma Chase Perdana, Damansara Heights, Kuala Lumpur in 2020 when MAEPS was used a COVID-19 pandemic hospital.

== History ==
Perdana University was founded in 2011. Former Prime Minister of Malaysia, Tun Dr. Mahathir Mohamad, was appointed as its Founding Chancellor. Dato' Pahlawan Dr. R. Mohana Dass served as the founding Vice-Chancellor and Chief Executive of the Perdana University.

The University previously operated from an interim campus in the Malaysia Agro Exposition Park Serdang (MAEPS). The University has since then been relocated to Wisma Chase Perdana, Damansara Heights in 2020.

Current Chancellor is Tan Sri Dr. Suleiman bin Mohamed from September 2023.

== Academics ==
PU offers Diplomas, Bachelors, Masters, and Doctorates in various disciplines: Medicine and Health Sciences, Applied Science and Technology, Business & Finance, and Liberal Arts.

== Ownership ==
Perdana University is a wholly owned subsidiary of Academic Medical Centre Sdn Bhd (AMC).

== See also ==
- Perdana University-Royal College of Surgeons in Ireland School of Medicine
