= Pallava coinage =

The Pallava dynasty ruled Thondai Nadu, the northern part of Tamil country, from 275 CE to 897 CE. Early studies about Pallava coins were made by Walter Elliot.

The Pallava coins were minted in lead, copper and bronze. Silver and gold coins have not been discovered, but in Pallava inscriptions there is a note about gold coins. The coins were mostly round, and a very few were square. They weigh about 0.450 to 9.8 grams and size is about 1 cm to 2.5 cm. The basic symbols in Pallava coins are bull and lion. The bull is the royal emblem of Pallavas and the emblem of the Hindu god Shiva. Apart from bull and lion, symbols such as the swastika, chakra, flag, twin-masted ship, elephant, and crescent were also seen in Pallava coins. The ship design found on coins is believed to represent the successful invasion and control of the rich eastern seaport of Kaviripaddinam.
