= Business to Arts =

Irish charitable organization

Business to Arts is an Irish membership-based, charitable organisation established in 1988. It brokers, enables and supports creative partnerships between businesses and individuals. Membership subscriptions by businesses and individuals form the primary source of funding for the organisation, together with funding from the Department of Culture, Communications and Sport.

== History and activities ==
Business to Arts was incorporated on 24 August 1988 under the name "Cothú.

The organisation runs the annual "Business to Arts Awards" which, as of 2021, was operated in partnership with the DAA (formerly Dublin Airport Authority) who commissioned original sculptures to award to the winning companies .

Business to Arts has also developed a series of arts funds. Some of these funds have involved the likes of Accenture for the Women on Walls Campaign, Bank of Ireland for the Begin Together Arts Fund, Dublin Port Company for the Port Perspectives - Community Arts Programme, and Dublin City Council for The Docklands Arts Fund.

New Stream, a project operated by Business to Arts, was established in 2009 to "strengthen the skills of the Irish cultural sector to generate new funding streams from non-public sources more effectively", and was funded by Bank of America Merrill Lynch and the Department of Tourism, Culture, Arts, Gaeltacht, Sport and Media. As part of the programme, a 24-month "Arts' Fellowship programme", was initiated in partnership with Dublin City Council Culture Company.

"Fund it" is a crowdfunding website, run by Business to Arts, for creative projects in Ireland. As of 2021, "Fund it" had reportedly helped raise over €5.2 million and supported over 1,200 creative projects.
