= Pahlawan Mohanadas =

Malaysian military doctor (born 1948)

Yang Berbahagia Major General (R) Dato' Pahlawan Dr Mohana Dass Ramasamy
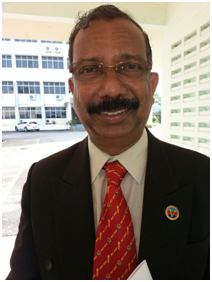
- Dato' Mohana Dass in August 2007

Director General, Health Services, Armed Forces of Malaysia
- In office 16 July 1981 – December 2004

CEO, Melaka-Manipal Medical College
- In office 2005–2006

Deputy Vice-Chancellor, MAHSA University College
- In office 2007–2010

Vice-Chancellor, Perdana University
- In office 2010–2013

Deputy Chairman, Board of Governors, Cyberjaya University College of Medical Sciences
- In office 2013–Present

Personal details
- Born: 15 March 1948 (age 78) Alor Setar, Kedah, Federation of Malaya (now Malaysia)
- Citizenship: Malaysian
- Education: Madras Medical College, University of New South Wales, Mahidol University
- Profession: Public Health Medicine
- Website: www.genmohan.com

Dato' Pahlawan R. Mohana Dass (born 1948) is a former head of the Malaysian Armed Forces Health Services. He has held leadership roles in educational institutions and universities in Malaysia and is registered as a specialist in Public Health in the National Specialist Register.

== Education ==
Mohanadas graduated from the Madras Medical College in 1974. He holds a Masters in Health Planning from the University of New South Wales, a Diploma in Industrial Health from the Royal College of Physicians and Surgeons of England and Society of Apothecaries, and a Diploma in Tropical Medicine and Hygiene from Mahidol University.

== Career ==
Following retirement from military service, Mohanadas was Chief Executive of the Melaka Manipal Medical College, Deputy Vice Chancellor of the MAHSA University College and as the founding Vice Chancellor and Chief Executive of the Perdana University. He stopped full-time employment in 2013. He is the Vice Chairman of the Board of Governors of the Cyberjaya University College of Medical Sciences and Eximius Medical Administration Systems (eMAS).

Mohanadas is a Fellow of the Faculty of Occupational Medicine, Royal College of Physicians of Ireland and a Fellow of the Academy of Medicine of Malaysia. He is registered as a specialist in Public Health in the National Specialist Register. Mohanadas has been a member of the Malaysian Medical Association since 1981. He has worked in the Council and ExCo of the MMA as Hon Secretary of the Wilayah Branch, Deputy Hon General Secretary MMA from 1987 to 1990 and Hon General Secretary of MMA in 1992–93. He has also was Secretary and Chairman of the Public Health Society of the MMA, Action on Smoking or Health Committee of the MMA and the Accident Prevention Committee of the MMA.

== Awards and honours ==
Mohanadas was awarded the “Most Outstanding Alumnus” of the Faculty of Tropical Medicine, Mahidol University in 2011, the Outstanding Achievement Award of SOMGRIM 2012 (Society of Medical Graduates from India Malaysia) and the Malaysian Medical Association Gold Medal in 2013.
