= Pöhlbach =

River in Germany

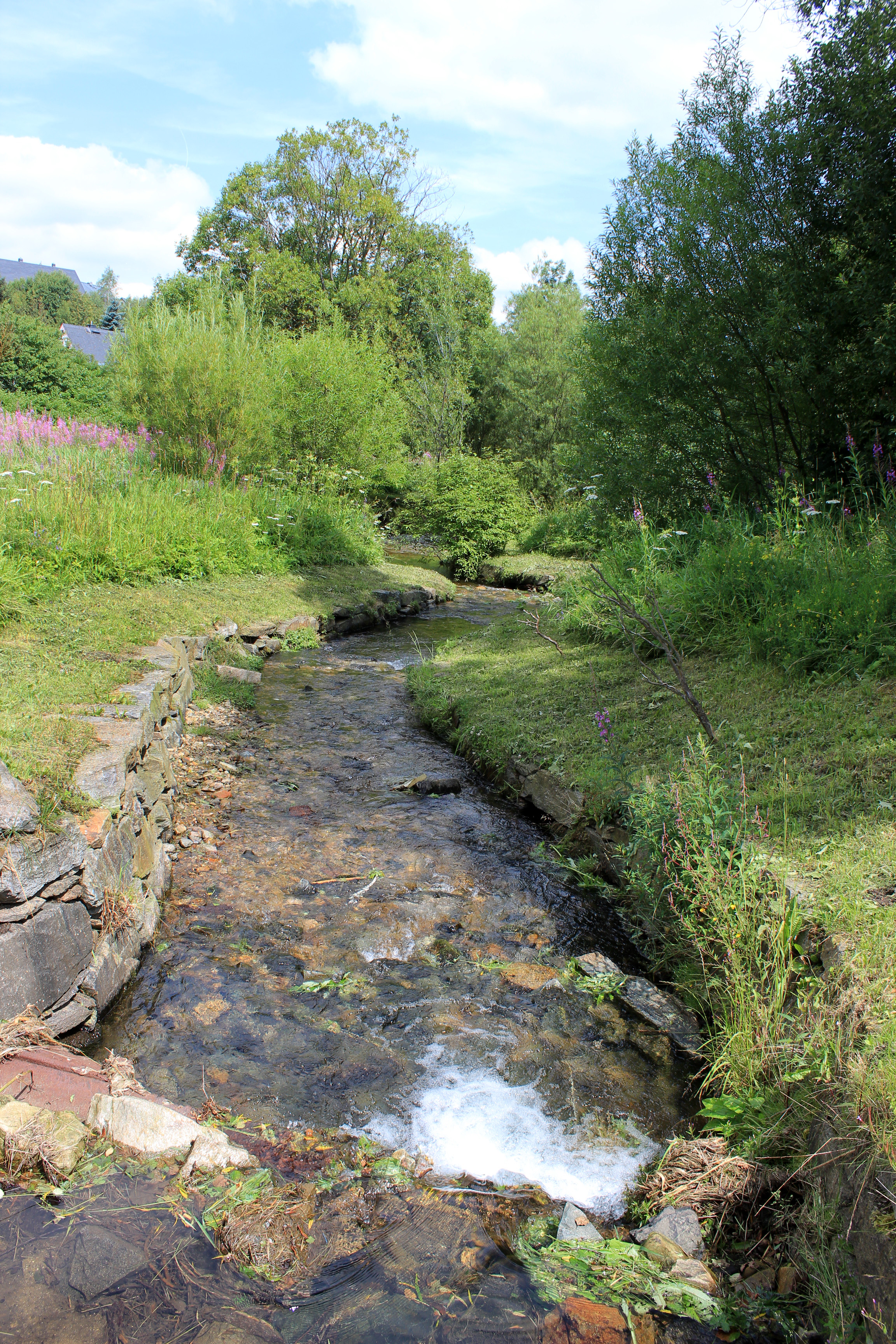

Location
- Countries: Germany; Czech Republic
- State: Saxony
- Region: Ústí nad Labem

Physical characteristics
- Mouth
  - location: Zschopau
  - coordinates: 50.6236°N 13.0556°E

Basin features
- Progression: Zschopau→ Freiberger Mulde→ Mulde→ Elbe→ North Sea

The Pöhlbach (Czech: Polava) is a river of Saxony, Germany and of the Czech Republic. It is a right tributary of the Zschopau, which it joins near Thermalbad Wiesenbad.

== See also ==
- List of rivers of Saxony
- List of rivers of the Czech Republic
