= Pallav =

Hindu given name

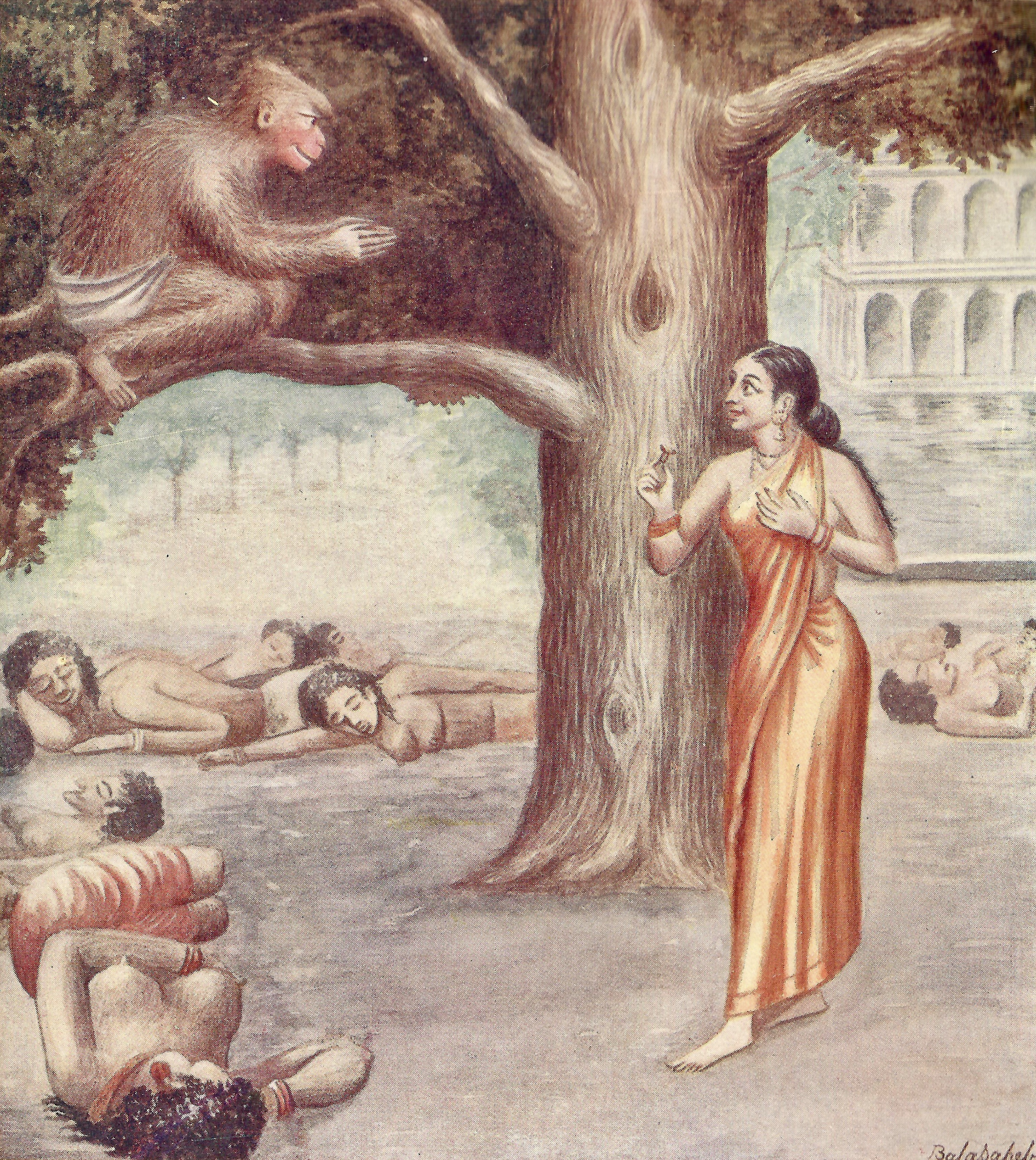
Lord Hanuman taking refuge in the leaves of a tree in Ashok Vatika

Pallav (पल्लव in Sanskrit Language) is a Hindu given name. It means a "newborn leaf" of any tree. The word is commonly associated with masculine usage. It is used (not very commonly) as names in the Indian subcontinent. Pallavi, which is used more commonly as a feminine name, is derived from Sanskrit word Pallav. Kopal is also synonymous to 'Pallav', but is often used as a feminine name. Kislay (किसलय) is also a Hindi word which has same meaning and is used as a masculine name. In Sanskrit and South Indian languages traditions, Pallav can also be written as Pallava, with an additional vowel "a" in the end.

== Origins ==
The origins of Pallav trace back to Vedic texts. In the epic Ramayana the words Pallav and Kislay are used on various occasions. In the Sundara Kanda chapter of Ramayana, when Lord Hanuman visits Lanka to find Sita ji, he hides in a tree of Ashok Vatika; the soft leaves (Pallavas) of that tree give shelter and comfort to Lord Hanuman. In the available works of Indian history, the other known usage of this name comes from the Pallava Dynasty of South India. Pallav is the Sanskrit version of Tamil word tondai. This dynasty had its roots in the northernmost region of present-day Tamil Nadu. That place was known as Tondainadu. Pallavas' soon gained prominence and established one of the major kingdoms of South India.

Hinduism and Zoroastrianism are two sister religions that were originated in Ancient Iran. So the 19th century archeologists were of the view that the Pallav resembles very closely with Pahlavas, and it gave rise to an alternative view that the name itself is of Persian origin. Since there is no credible research available to support this view, some of the modern archeologists seriously doubts this hypothesis and suggests that this name is of Dravidian origin.

Pallav has found its place in many poetic, literary, and musical works of Hindi language.
