= Malaysian Maverick =

2009 book by Barry Wain

Malaysian Maverick: Mahathir Mohamad in Turbulent Times
- Author: Barry Wain
- Language: English
- Subject: Biography
- Publisher: Palgrave Macmillan
- Publication date: December 4, 2009
- Publication place: Malaysia
- ISBN: 978-0-230-23873-2

Malaysian Maverick: Mahathir Mohamad in Turbulent Times is a biography of Mahathir Mohamad written by the Australian journalist Barry Wain (1944–2013) and published in 2009. Bookstores sold out of the book after its debut in Malaysia in April 2010, with all 500 copies sold and additional reprints of 5,000 copies that year.
