= Royal Mint of Malaysia =

The Royal Mint of Malaysia (Malay: Kilang Tempa Syiling Diraja Malaysia, كيلڠ تمڤت شيليڠ دراج مليسيا) was the national mint of Malaysia. The original name was Kilang Wang Bank owned by Boustead Mint Sdn Bhd, before it became private and was renamed Royal Mint of Malaysia on October 1, 1998. It was located at the Kompleks Kilang Wang Bank Negara Malaysia in Shah Alam. It was established in 2003 to strike coins of Malaysia until 2006. The 1967 Malaysian coinage issue was struck at the Royal Mint in London.

== See also ==
- Malaysian ringgit
