= William Raffles Flint =

North Borneo government official (1855–1915)

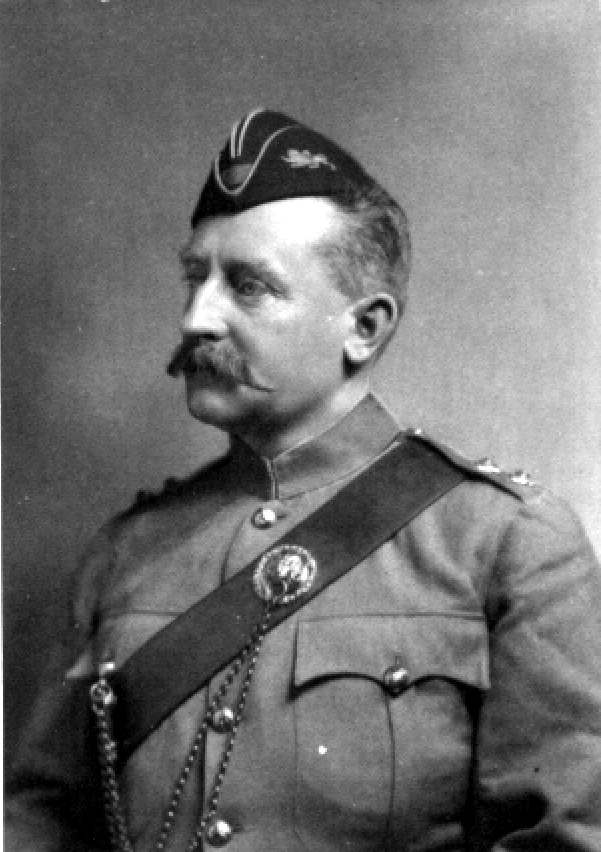

Personal details
- Born: 9 December 1855 Teignmouth, Devon, England
- Died: 5 July 1915 (aged 59) Newcastle upon Tyne, Northumberland, England
- Resting place: St. Andrew's Cemetery, Newcastle
- Relations: Stamford Raffles (Great-uncle)
- Parents: The Reverend William Charles Raffles Flint; Jenny Rosdew Mudge

Military service
- Branch/service: British North Borneo Constabulary
- Rank: Captain
- Battles/wars: Kandurong War; Kawang Amok; Omadal Expedition; Padas Damit War; Kalabakang Expedition; Sigunting War; Mat Salleh Rebellion

William Raffles Flint, known as Raffles, was a high-ranking government official in North Borneo (present day Sabah), serving as a Postmaster, Harbour Master, Magistrate, and for many years as Sub-Commandant of the British North Borneo Constabulary. While he never served officially as Commandant, on several occasions he took up the position of Acting Commandant.

== Biography ==
=== Early life ===
William Raffles Flint was the grandson of William Lawrence Flint, an officer of the Royal Navy and the first Master Attendant for the Straits Settlements. His grandmother, Mary Anne Raffles, was the sister of Stamford Raffles, one of the founders of British Singapore. During his youth, Flint's family remained highly connected to the British machinery in South Asia and Southeast Asia, and especially the leadership of the chartered companies operating there.

Flint was trained in England as a Naval cadet.

=== North Borneo ===
In 1881, when Alfred Dent and Baron Overbeck created the North Borneo Chartered Company, Flint was one of the first recruits from their London office. Just after his 26th birthday, on 12 December 1881, Flint was commissioned as a Junior Officer aboard the company's steam yacht, SY Banshee, later renamed SY Leila.

Flint served aboard SY Leila until 1 May 1882, when he was transferred into the British North Borneo Civil Service and advanced to First Lieutenant. His posting in the Civil Service was to North Borneo's capital, Kudat, as the town's Harbour Master, Postmaster, and Magistrate 3rd Class.

In 1883, he was transferred from Kudat to Sandakan, shortly before it became the new capitol. He served here in Sandakan as Harbour Master, Postmaster, and Magistrate 2nd Class.

=== Constabulary ===
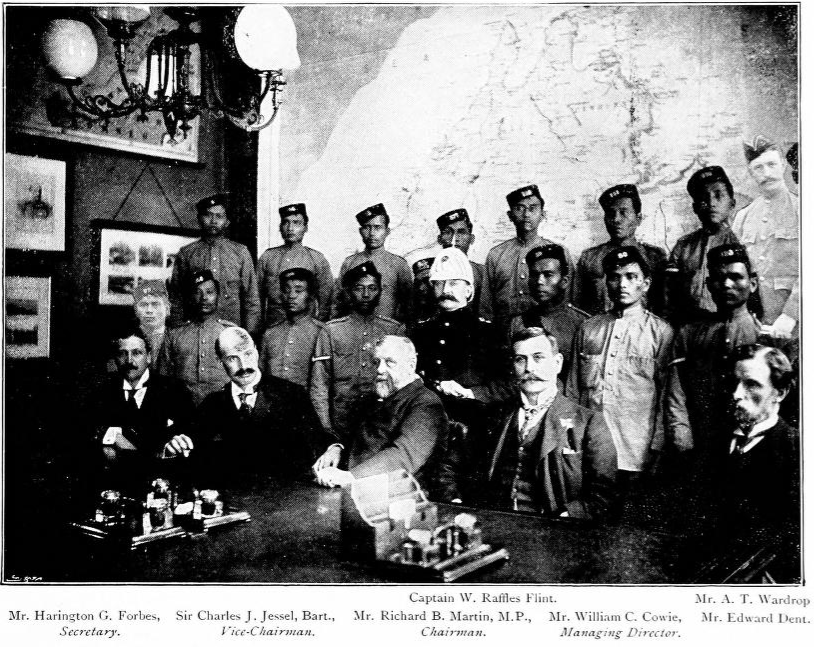
Board of directors of the company, surrounded by the members of the British North Borneo Constabulary. Flint is pictured in the center, wearing the white hat.

When Commandant A. M. de Fontaine was killed in action on 15 May 1885, Flint became the Acting Chief Inspector of the British North Borneo Constabulary. On 24 May 1885, as Acting Commandant, Flint led an armed punitive expedition from Papar to Kawang, where De Fontaine had just been killed. This expedition of retaliation lasted until 1 June, searching for the rebel leader Kandurong.

In 1886, when Governor Treacher launched the punitive expedition against the residents of Omadal Island, Flint led the Constabulary landing party to destroy several villages there, all under the cover of canon fire from the HMS Zephyr, which forced the island to submit.

On 1 January 1888, Flint was appointed as Sub-Commandant, the second in command of the Constabulary under Commandant R. D. Beeston. During his tenure, he fought in the Padas Damit War and in several expeditions into the jungles of Borneo. In 1889, he took the posting of Superintendent of Police.

=== Massacre on the Kalabakan River (1890) ===
In 1887, Flint's brother, Charles Walter Flint, arrived in North Borneo after word had reached him of the North Borneo gold rush at the Segama Goldfields along the Segama River (near present-day Segama). While Charles never found any gold, he did wind up settling in the Kinabatangan River and opening a trading depot there.

In 1890, a report came to Captain Beeston that Flint's brother had died of dysentery somewhere near his trading post, but the story was suspicious to Flint. Flint discovered that his brother, Charles, had married a local girl, and her father had had reservations about racial purity at the time. However, it was when the stepfather wound up in debt to Charles, that he tried to escape the area with his family. Charles went to track him down, and was murdered.

Flint found his brother's beheaded corpse and head buried in the ground not far from the trading post. He took one other white officer named Godfrey Hewett, and a force of 12 Iban constabulary to track down Numpal, the man who had killed his brother. When they got to the village of Regan, on the Kalabakan River, Kalabakan District, not far from the southern border with Dutch Kalimantan, they found a Tenggala longhouse with over a hundred people inside. Flint and his men massacred the more than 140 men, women, and children living there.

When news of the massacre reached Singapore and Hong Kong, it quickly spread to the rest of the world. The Dutch East Indies government at Batavia, Java, and the Netherlands officially rebuked the company, and sent a letter to the British government in London that this had occurred in what they officially claimed as part of Dutch Kalimantan. The British High Commissioner to Singapore condemned the act, as did the Foreign Office.

Governor Creagh, however, did not suspend Hewett or Flint, and kept them in the government.

=== Later career ===
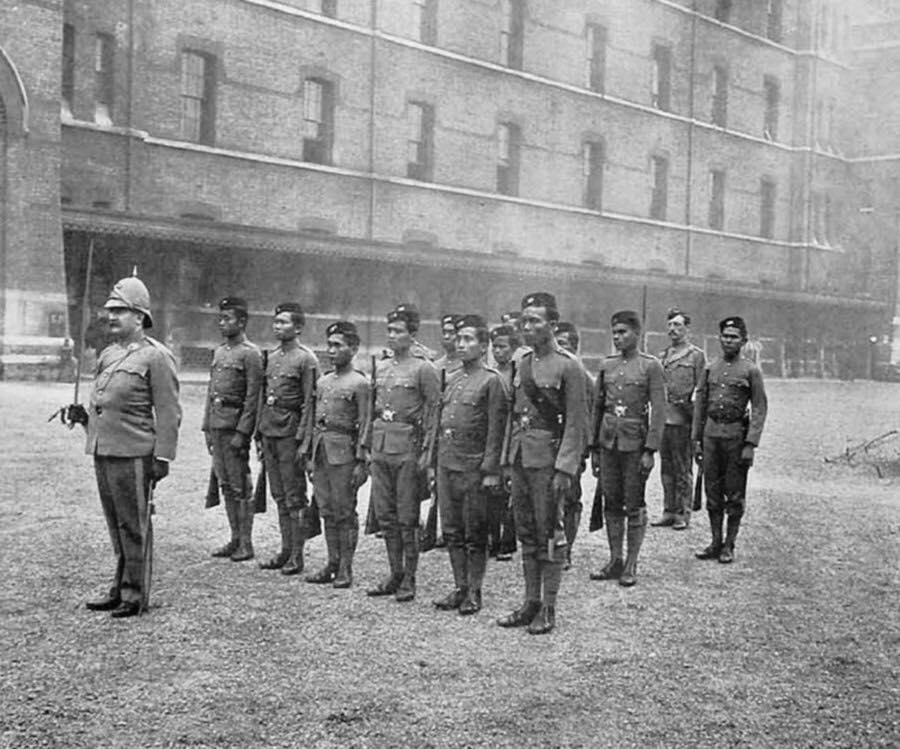
In May 1897, Flint (left) lead a ceremonial contingent of the British North Borneo Constabulary at the Diamond Jubilee of Queen Victoria, traveling from Borneo to attend.

In 1893, Flint was seconded to British Labuan to become the Resident of Labuan and Province Dent. In 1896, when Commandant Beeston suffered from mental illness and tendered his resignation, Flint again became Acting Commandant until a suitable replacement could be found.

The Sigunting War and the Mat Salleh Rebellion were being fought simultaneously, and Raffles was involved with both. As part of the operations against Mat Salleh, Flint led expeditions on the Labuk River and the Sugut River. In 1896, he also managed to capture Salleh's fort at Penindakan on the Lin Kabow River, but Salleh escaped.

In May 1897, Flint took a contingent of the Constabulary to England to celebrate the Diamond Jubilee of Queen Victoria.

When he returned to North Borneo on 29 August 1898, he was appointed Wing Officer. On 6 December 1901, he was re-appointed Sub Commandant.

Flint officially retired from government service on a pension in 1909. More accurately, the Governor asked that he did not return from leave. Only a year later, in 1910, Flint tripped while walking down the stairs. As a result, several weeks later, he had to get his right leg amputated at the thigh.

He became a director of Kimanis Rubber Company for a short time.

He died less than five years later, a bachelor. He is buried at St. Andrew's Cemetery, which has since merged with the Jesmond Old Cemetery to become St. Andrew's and Jesmond Cemetery, in Newcastle upon Tyne.

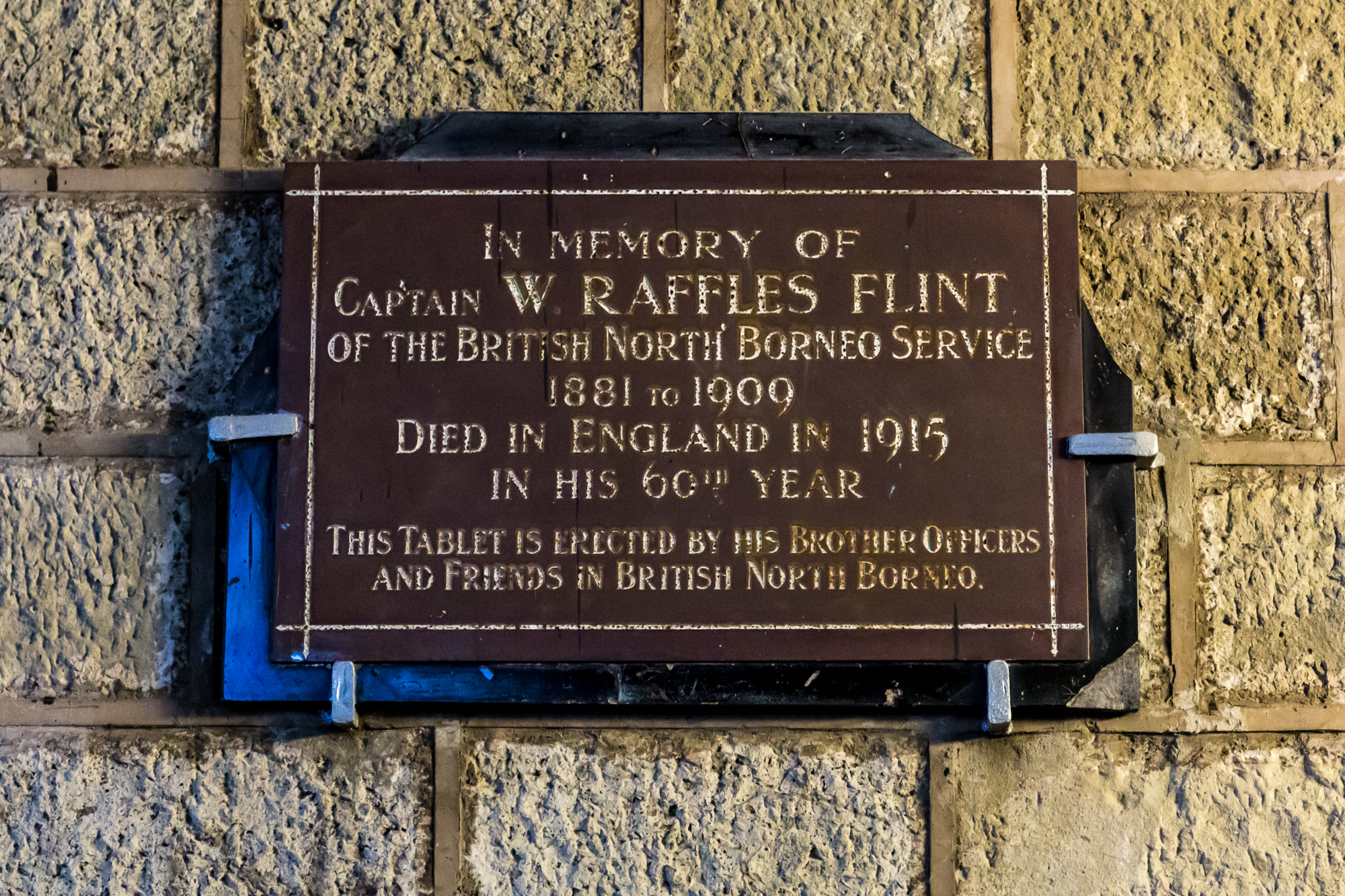
Memorial to Flint at Sandakan. This tablet, made of bronze, was installed at the Sandakan Church in 1922.
