= Padas Damit War =

1888 conflict in Borneo

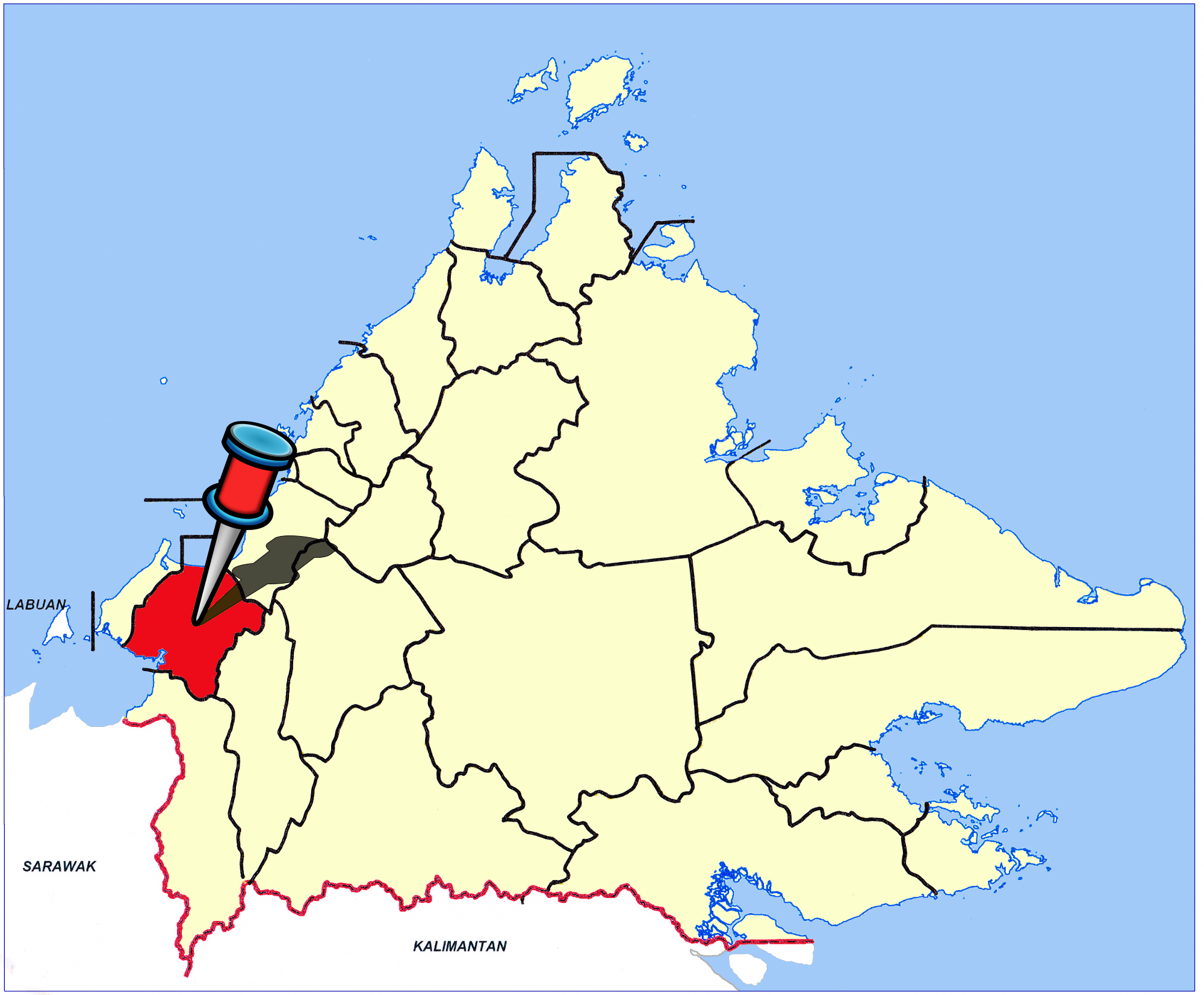
- Location of Padas Damit
Date	1888-1889 (1 year)
Location	British North Borneo
Result	British North Borneo victory

Belligerents
Brunei; Padas Damit	North Borneo Chartered Company

Commanders and leaders
Panglima Hassan (Note: There is conflicting accounts whether his name is Bahar or Hassan); Dang Insum; Sharif Omar; Laksamana Denrias; Majapara; Macanggar	Charles Vandeleur Creagh; Dominick Daniel Daly; Robert Dudley Beeston; William Raffles Flint

Units involved
Bisaya; Bruneian Malays	British North Borneo Constabulary

Strength
around 150 men	3,000

Casualties and losses
42 men (initial); Unknown	7 policemen (initial) likely Heavy

The Padas Damit War, known to the British as the Padas Damit Expedition, was a war between 1888 and 1889 that arose out of an 1884 territorial dispute between the Brunei Pengiran, Shabandhar Bessar Muhammad Salleh Panglima Hassan and the North Borneo Chartered Company over the undefined border between Padas Besar and Padas Damit in the Klias Peninsula (modern day Beaufort District, Sabah).

== Background ==
=== The Company ===
In 1881, the North Borneo Chartered Company was established to rule over the newly created country of North Borneo – much to the displeasure of other British interests in the region at Labuan, only 5 miles to the west of Borneo. "The Company" began rapidly expanding their territory through deals and arrangements to acquire tulin land rights from the various Sultans and Pengirans along the coast of the northeastern portion of the island of Borneo. This was a country managed entirely by a company whose objective was profit, and the island's navigable rivers were deemed economic powerhouses; goods obtained from inland could be transported down-river to ocean-going vessels, where they could then be sold on the global market.

In 1884, the Sultanate of Brunei experienced the Limbang Uprising, when Limbang River residents revolted against overtaxation by Pengiran Temenggong and went on the war path against Brunei Town. When the rebels had almost reached the capitol, the government asked Governor Treacher for aid. In exchange for his help (and after a British warship captain sailed into the harbor to admonish the Sultan for trying to attack the rebels at the same time Treacher was trying to negotiate with them), Sultan Abdul Momin and his ministers ceded most of the Padas-Klias Peninsula to the Company. The agreement was signed on 5 November 1884.

The Sultan Abdul died on 30 May 1885, and was replaced by Temenggong, who had become Sultan Hashim.

In 1885, Dominick Daniel Daly (son of Dominick Daly) was appointed as the Assistant Resident of Dent Province and was stationed at Mempakul.

=== Pengiran Shabandhar ===
All of those minor Pengirans with tulins along the Padas had become resentful that the Sultan had not compensated them for the sale. One of those Pengirans was Pengiran Shabandhar, who maintained that he was the sole owner over the tulin of Padas Damit, the land lying between the Padas and Klias rivers, and would not accept the Company's claim or any compensation.

This was land that the Sultan Abdul had gifted to his elder half-sister, Fatima, through a dowry. Fathima was most likely the daughter of Sultan Kanzul Alam, gifted Padas Damit as a wedding present after her marriage to Duli Pengiran Di-Gadong – however, there are three other women that Fathima might have been, and little written records exist of the exact lineage. Tribal histories, as well, feature several conflicting lineages for Fathima. Shabandhar's father had been a Borneo native and member of the landed gentry of the White Rajah, Sir James Brooke, and a soldier in several expeditions for the British into Sarawak. When Fathima died, the land went to him.

The Company requested that boundary markers be placed to indicate the two areas. However, Pengiran Shabandhar and his men refused to do so.

Pengiran Syahbandar objected to the Brunei Government's decision and claimed his rights as the administrator of Sungai Tulin Padas Damit. In one incident where three times the head of the Padas Klias community planted boundary marks in the area and three times Pengiran Shahbandar and his people destroyed the boundary marks. Community leaders and Tulin people who transferred their allegiance to the company and moved into the company's borders were constantly attacked and killed by Pengiran Shahbandar's armed men, including his personal police force and his followers.

The Bisayas who were fiercely loyal to Shahbandar declared that they would die to defend their home and would support Shahbandar. They conducted raids at night against people who had pledged their allegiance to the Company. Attacks on disloyal Padas Klias community leaders would be carried out openly in broad daylight until many houses and properties were destroyed. Several attempts to find peace between the community leaders and Pengiran Shahbandar failed.

The Company requested the Sultan's intervention to resolve this problem based on the terms of the prior agreement.

This continued for 2 years until a document dated 1 February 1887 was issued by the Brunei Government stating that the surrender of the Padas Klias area on 5 November 1884 was valid and stated that several payments to several Pengiran owners, administrators of several Sungai Tulin had not been paid and requested the company's favor to help explain the payments demanded by the owners and administrators of Sungai Tulin. The Company compensated the land-owners, but the new Brunei government did not do so.

=== The new Governor ===
In April 1897, an interregnum occurred in North Borneo when Governor Treacher left the island. William Crocker acted as governor for a short while before Charles Vandeleur Creagh was appointed as the 2nd Governor of North Borneo. Creagh was entirely opposed to Pengiran Shabandhar's claims.

In September 1888, Shahbandar's men attacked the village of Kabajan. They, once again, pulled down property markers delineating the border, and raised five homes to the ground.

While Governor Treacher had once written that Pengiran Shahbandar was "one of 'the most respectable and intelligent' of the Brunei Rajahs," Creagh had never met the Pengiran. More importantly, Creagh had never been given proper intelligence on the area of Padas Damit or the Pengiran's case, and was, in the words of the historian Ian Black: "curiously ignorant." Assistant Resident Dominick Daniel Daly had been feeding Creagh a false narrative of Shahbandar's cause. Assistant Resident Daly told Creagh that Penigran Shahbandar was: "a madman [and] a Muslin fanatic." Daly had never discovered that Shabandar had never actually been paid for his land, despite Treacher's promise to do so.

Creagh also believed that Shahbandar was not acting on his own behalf, but was the tool of other British interests in the area – primarily the White Rajahs, Peter Leys (the Administrator of Labuan), and William Cowie. Even though Cowie was on the board of the Company, Creagh believed that Cowie would benefit from undermining the Padas Damit because he was trying to sell his own land in Brunei for a profit.

The Company also implemented laws and levy designed to punish the residents for Pengiran Shahbandar Hassan's defiance. Life became hard and freedom of movement was limited. Seeing the hardship endured by the people in the region, Shahbandar called for a meeting with the people. With this, Shahbandar decided to go to war against the Company.

== War ==
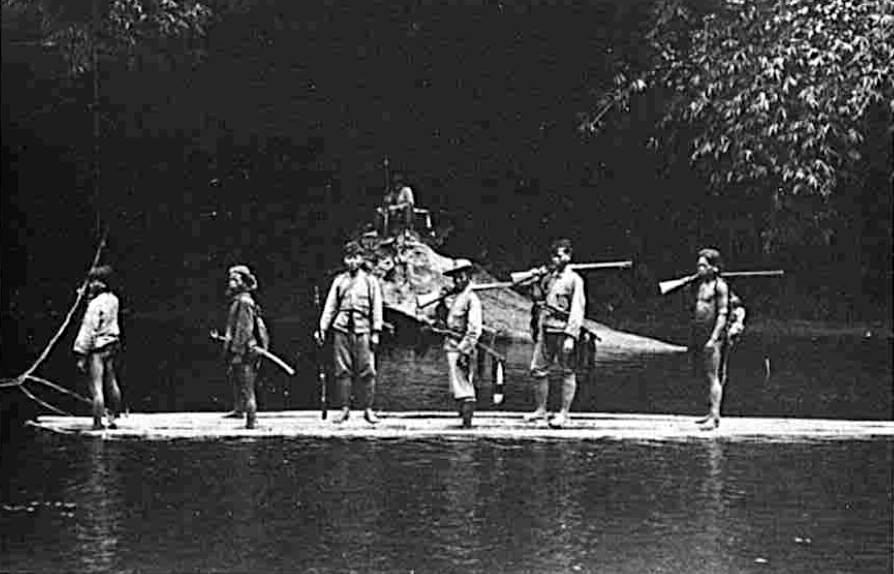
The British North Borneo Constabulary were the sole military and police force of North Borneo.

On 8 December 1888, Mr. Daly and Captain R. D. Beeston with a force of the British North Borneo Constabulary headed to the house of a criminal named Patek in the Padas Damit area. On the way to Padas Damit, the Constabulary was ambushed by 150 of Pengiran Syahbandar's warriors with quite difficult conditions, the Constabulary were forced to retreat. In response, the Company labelled them as pirates to justify their aggression.

Shabandhar had constructed four primary fortifications built in the defense of Padas Damit;

- Kota Manggalela, the strongest out of the four
- Kota Galila, likely commanded by Sharif Omar
- Kota Makarang, commanded by Dang Insum
- Kota Padas Damit, the administrative fort

On 10 December 1888, British forces led by Governor Creagh launched their first major attack. They focused on this central fort, Kota Padas Damit to break the command of Pengiran Syahbandar Hassan. The fort was bombarded and captured early in the campaign, though Pengiran Syahbandar did not surrender.

In January 1889, after the fall of Kota Padas Damit, the British moved toward Kota Makarang, a fortified town along the Padas River. The Constabulary, with a force of 200 strong, fired on the city repeatedly with cannon beginning January 1889. Despite heavy resistance, the fort was destroyed by artillery fire. Dang Isum was killed on 10 March 1889, while fighting to defend the city.

On March until April 1889, Kota Galila fell as the British forces systematically cleared the Padas riverbanks in the months following the capture of Makarang.

In May 1889 was the final stronghold. Its strong construction and reputation for having a "magical" white cloth barrier made it the most difficult to take, marking the end of the war and the surrender of the resistance. The next day, the Company brought Pengiran Syahbandar to negotiate a peace agreement by setting several conditions, including that a criminal named Patek be handed over to the police and that Sungai Tulin Padas Damit be handed over to the company with an annual payment.

== Aftermath ==
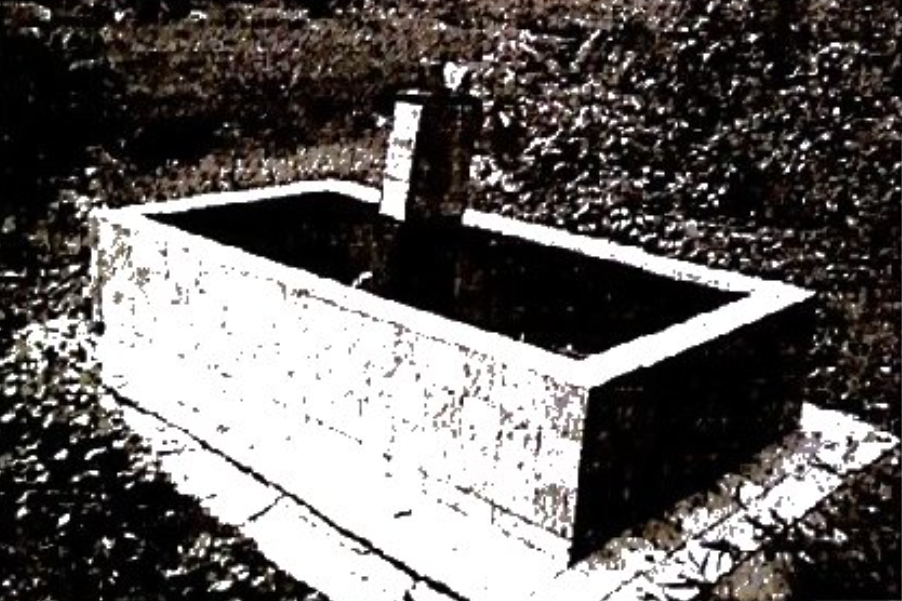
Dang Insum, whose grave is seen here, is regarded as one of the greatest female warriors ever seen in the history of Borneo.

The Padas Damit War was the Company's way of demonstrating to the native community their determination to protect its police officers and demand their rights as stipulated in the 1884 agreement.

After the war was over, however, Governor Creagh uncovered a document written by Governor Treacher that promised Shabandar would be compensated fully for his land... compensation that had never been paid. After further discussions with Shabandar, Creagh realized this might have been the reason for the rebellion.

Padas Damit was finally handed over to the Company by Pengiran Shahbandar in an agreement dated 1 March 1889 and 2 March 1889 with Governor Charles Vandelor Creagh for a payment of $330.00 per year including the company's debt to Pengiran Shahbandar for 2 years mixed with interest of $100.00 and 5% per year totaling $733.50.

The company also agreed to pay Pengiran Shahbandar a living allowance of $2130.00 per year and if he had no heirs, he would be paid $1065.00 per year. The company agreed to give an advance payment of $2130.00 to Pengiran Shahbandar. This agreement was also signed by the Sultan and Babu Fatimah. Pengiran Shabandar surrendered his claims of sovereignty and swore fealty to the Sultan of Brunei. Local narrative tradition, however, holds that Pengiran Shabandar was tied to bamboo at low tide and drowned as the water rose above his head.

Around a decade after the end of the Padas Damit Expedition, the city of Beaufort and Beaufort District were established in roughly the area where Padas Damit had been.
