= Omadal Expedition =

British campaign of territorial expansion (1886)

Date	June 1886
Location	Omadal Island, Darvel Bay, North Borneo
Result	Company victory

Belligerents
North Borneo Chartered Company	Omadal Island

Commanders and leaders
(North Borneo) William Hood Treacher; (North Borneo) William Burgess Pryer; (North Borneo) William Raffles Flint; (United Kingdom) Charles Kerr Hope	

Units involved
British North Borneo Constabulary; (United Kingdom) HMS Zephyr; (North Borneo) NBGL Sabine	

Casualties and losses
	Several villages burned

The Omadal Expedition (or Omaddal) was a punitive expedition of the North Borneo Chartered Company into Omadal Island against a rebel stronghold there for the control over Darvel Bay's market in edible bird's nests, the main ingredient of bird's nest soup.

== Background ==
The North Borneo Chartered Company was established in 1881 by Alfred Dent and his brother Edward Dent to become the sole governing authority over their newly established country of North Borneo. As their first Governor of North Borneo, they borrowed William Hood Treacher from the British Colonial Service – who was at that time the British Resident in Perak.

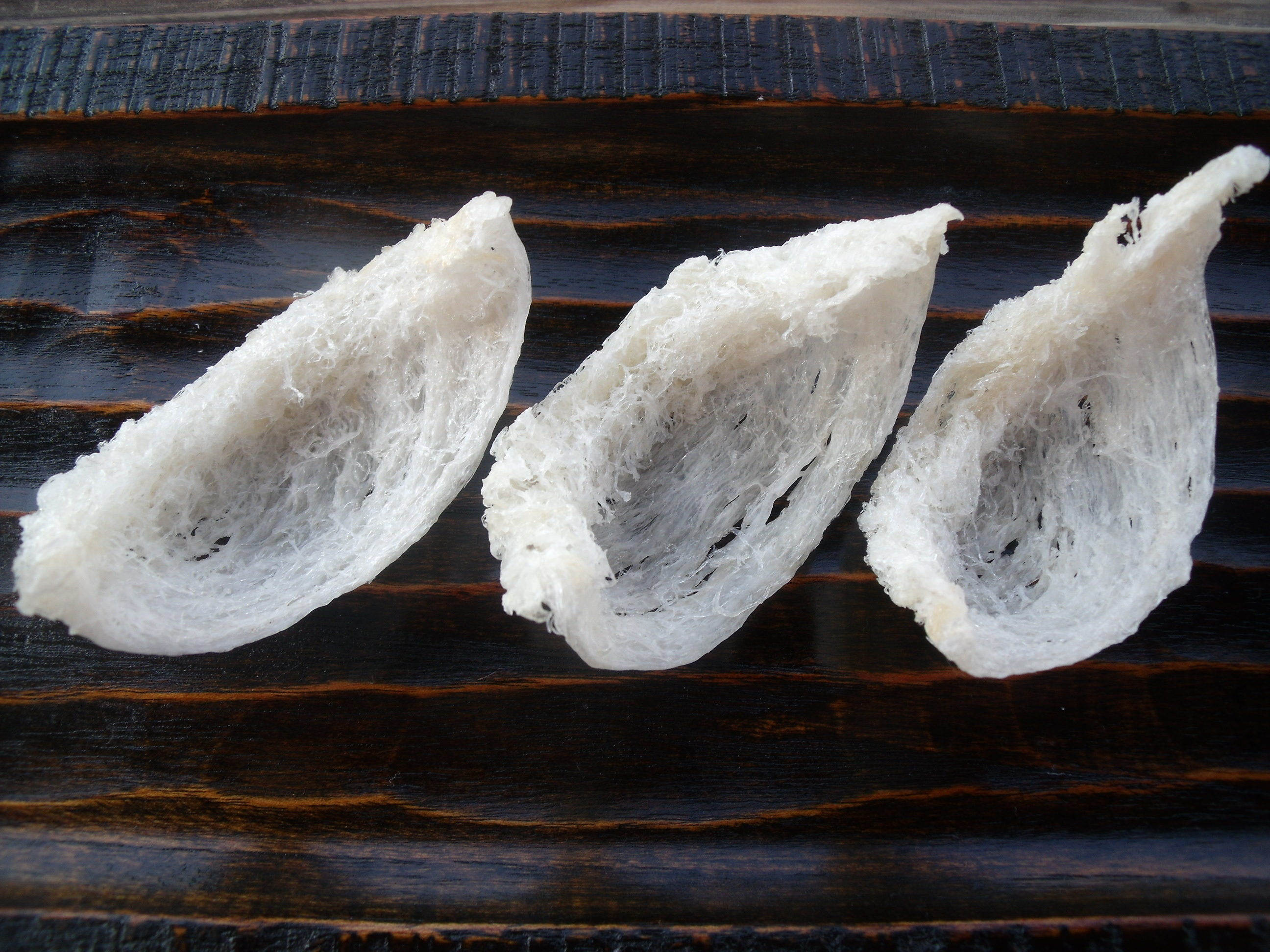
Three swiftlet edible bird's nests.

"The Company," as it was known, was a for-profit chartered company that existed at the behest of its shareholders, and whatever resources that might be extracted for profit from the lands of North Borneo were considered fair for exploitation by the company and its government. The first decade of North Borneo saw the company's territorial expansion through land deals and negotiations with the various Sultans, Pengirans, Emperors, and Kings of the region, but at various times, local indigenous tribes and populations rebelled against Company rule – often continuing the same rebellions that they had fought against the earlier sultanates. Among those were mostly nomadic seafaring people-groups that dominated the coastlines and held no national loyalty, referred to in colonial narratives using the racist term "Sea Gypsies," which might have been; Illanun, Sea Dyaks, Tausūg, Bajau, Kadazan-Dusun, or others.

Of the natural products produced in the islands and coastlines around Darvel Bay, the largest market here was that of edible bird's nests. Part of the intentions of the Dent brothers in creating the company was to corner the market on bird's nests in this area. It was the idea of Resident William Burgess Pryer to collect 20% duties on these nests, and have them all funneled through the markets at Elopura or Silam, to then be re-sold.

The capitol of the bird's nest trade from Darvel Bay was the port of Omadal Island, where the Bajau had managed to set up a traditional distribution hub; bird's nests from Borneo were sent here from the caves inland, and then sold onto the Sulu kings, Chinese traders, and the various European colonial traders of the region. In 1884, the Company installed a customs clerk named Usman at Omadal to impose taxes on their bird's nest exports. Usman fled the island under the threat of his life, chased out by the local inhabitants.

The Bajau had rebelled against previous attempts at foreign rule by the Dutch, the Spanish, and the Sulu. Omadal became a hub of rebel Bajau activity, and called the leaders of several Bajau tribes throughout Sabah to gather there. They rejected outright the taxation systems of the newly established Company in their territorial waters, and began preparations for war. The neighboring island of Kuli Babang (Bum Bum Island) also operated as a rebel base.

From Omadal, the Bajau began systematically attacking Company trading posts, the villages of Company-friendly tribes like the Era'an, and the marketplace and ulu at the European settlement in Silam.

== Expedition ==
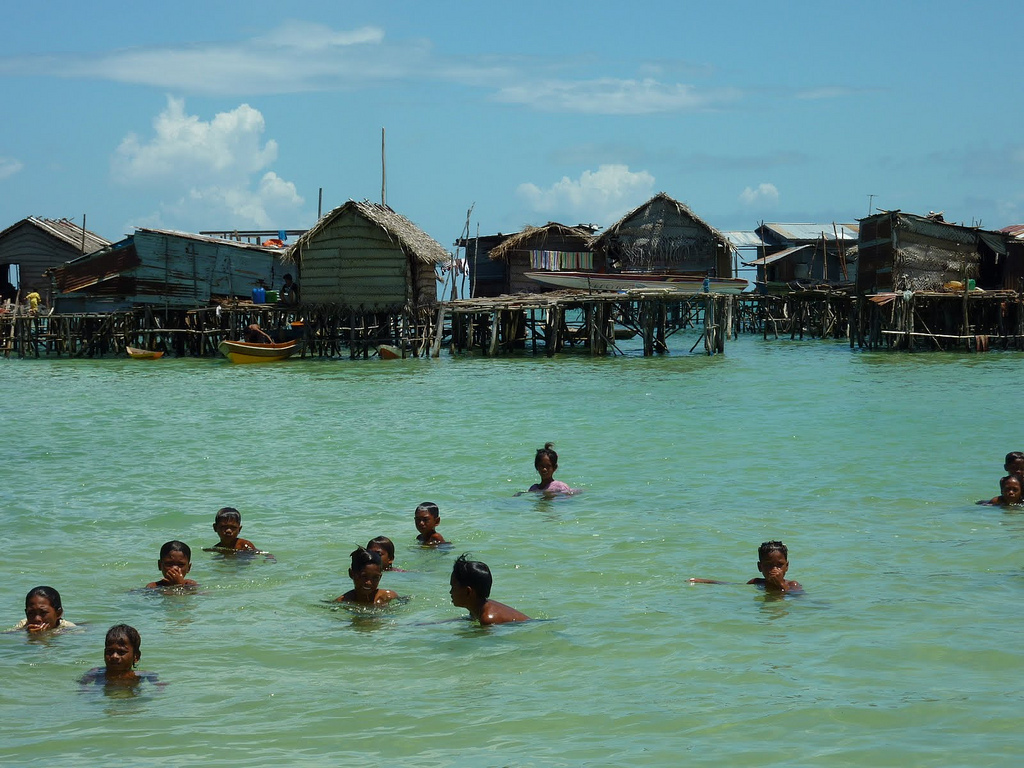
The Bajau still live on Omadal Island. However, there is only one village on the island today.

In 1886, Treacher requested assistance from Labuan, but the administrator Leys there was distrustful of the company's intentions. After Labuan refused assistance, Treacher sailed to British Singapore. He returned from Singapore with Lieutenant Commander Charles K. Hope and his Ariel-class gunboat HMS Zephyr (1873) to advance on Omadal. Aboard the Zephyr were sixty soldiers hired from Singapore, but they also stopped at Elopura to acquire a contingent of the British North Borneo Constabulary, also sixty-strong.

Officially, however, the Zephyr was engaged here in an anti-piracy and anti-slavery campaign. In a telegram, Commander Hope wrote:

"On reaching Omadal, the natives of two villages were seen making hostile motions in the direction of the Zephyr."

The Zephyr, when it arrived, fired on the island, and on the neighboring island of Kuli Babang. They officially requested the Chief of Omadal to board the Zephyr for negotiations, but he refused. The islanders then set sail in thirty small boats to engage in naval warfare against the Zephyr, but the Zephyr was able to eliminate all thirty of the small boats through canon fire.

Supported by the Zephyr was a smaller launch craft belonging to the government of North Borneo, the North Borneo Government Launch (NBGL) Sabine. These launches were the primary naval vessels of North Borneo, used to patrol its coastlines, and made up the bulk of the country's marine fleet. Aboard the Sabine was a contingent of forces from the British North Borneo Constabulary commanded by William Raffles Flint.

While the Zephyr fired on the island with its outfit of four canon, Flint's contingent of the Constabulary and the crew of the Sabine landed on Omadal and advanced inland to flank the Bajau. Flint's contingent burned several villages to the ground, and forced the islanders into submission.

In 1897, Treacher returned to Omadal to discover that the Bajau who had rebelled against the company had moved into Sulu territory to fight in the Sulu Civil War which was going on there.
