= Tregonning =

Tregonning may refer to:

== People ==
- Don Tregonning, British-Australian professional tennis player and coach
- Donald R. C. Tregonning, British-Australian army officer, physician and sportsman
- K. G. Tregonning, British-Australian historian
- Mel Tregonning, Australian artist

== Places ==
- Tregonning (hamlet), Cornwall, England, United Kingdom
- Tregonning Hill, Cornwall, England, United Kingdom

== See also ==
- Tregoning
