= British North Borneo Herald =

Magazine in British North Borneo (1883–1941)

The British North Borneo Herald monthly record. Vol. X, no. 8.

The British North Borneo Herald was a periodical magazine in British North Borneo, published between 1883 until 1941 by the government of North Borneo under various official names.

== History ==
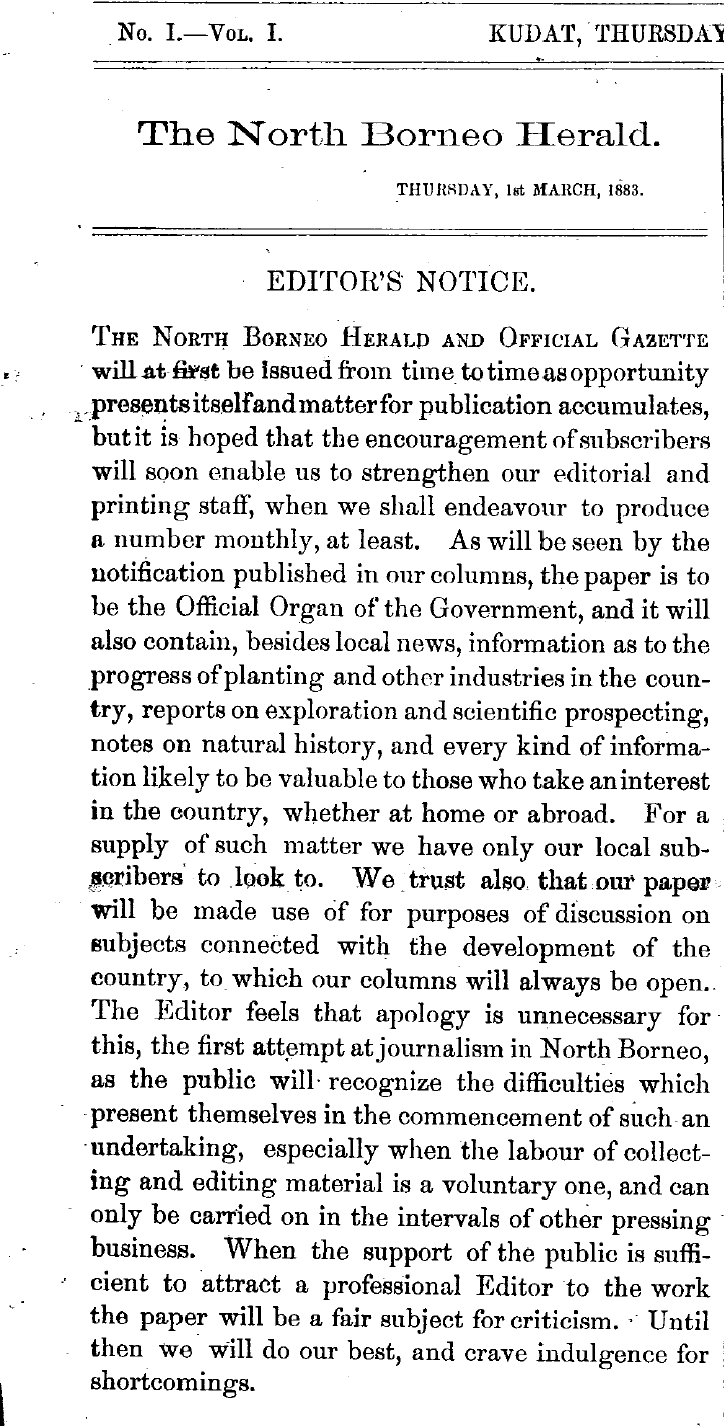
Editors Notice of the first edition on 1 March 1883

After the entry into force of the Royal Charter for the North Borneo Chartered Company on 1 November 1881, the company faced with the task of creating a functioning governmental structure for the acquired territory. The resolutions passed by the Court of Directors, the highest administrative body of the company in London, required efficient distribution within the administrative units in North Borneo as well as among the shareholders and investors of the company. For this reason, the first sixteen-page edition of the periodical "The North Borneo Herald and Official Gazette" appeared on 1 March 1883, in Kudat, the first capital of North Borneo.

For the monthly publication of the newspaper and the printing in the Dent Road no. 1, Thomas J. Keaughran, (Note: T. J. Keaughran was previously a Superintendent at Straits Settlement Printing in Singapore. Source: Straits Observer (Singapore), 29 April 1875, Page 14) a former reporter of The Straits Times was responsible. The single price was 10 cents, while the annual subscription was 1.50 Straits dollar. Alongside the founding publisher Keaughran, the founding editor of the Herald was Robert Dudley Beeston.

In 1883, Sandakan was raised as the new capital instead of Kudat, and the Herald moved their place of publication to the new administration area. The editorial and printing from 1885 to 1891 were by W. J. Rozario. From 1 January 1896, the Herald turned into a four-day appearance. The price per issue was still 10 cent, while the annual subscription including postal delivery increased to 2.50 Straits dollar.

The last edition appeared in 1941. Following the Japanese occupation in January 1942, especially when the Japanese marched into the town of Sandakan on 19 January; the journalistic activities were forbidden with immediate effect. The end of the operation under the North Borneo Chartered Company on 26 June 1946 also sealed the fate of the Herald, while the Official Gazette continued to exist as a memorandum of the British colonial government until 1963.

== Name changes ==
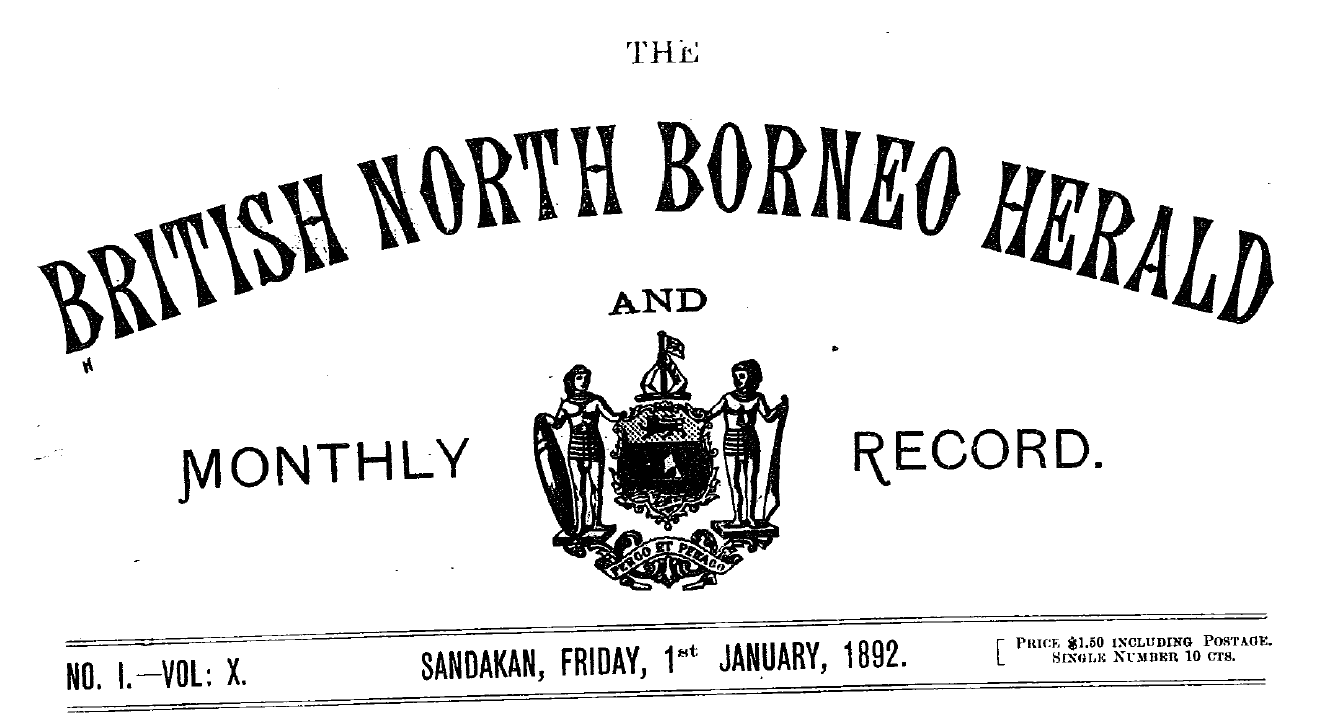
Title graphic from 1 January 1892

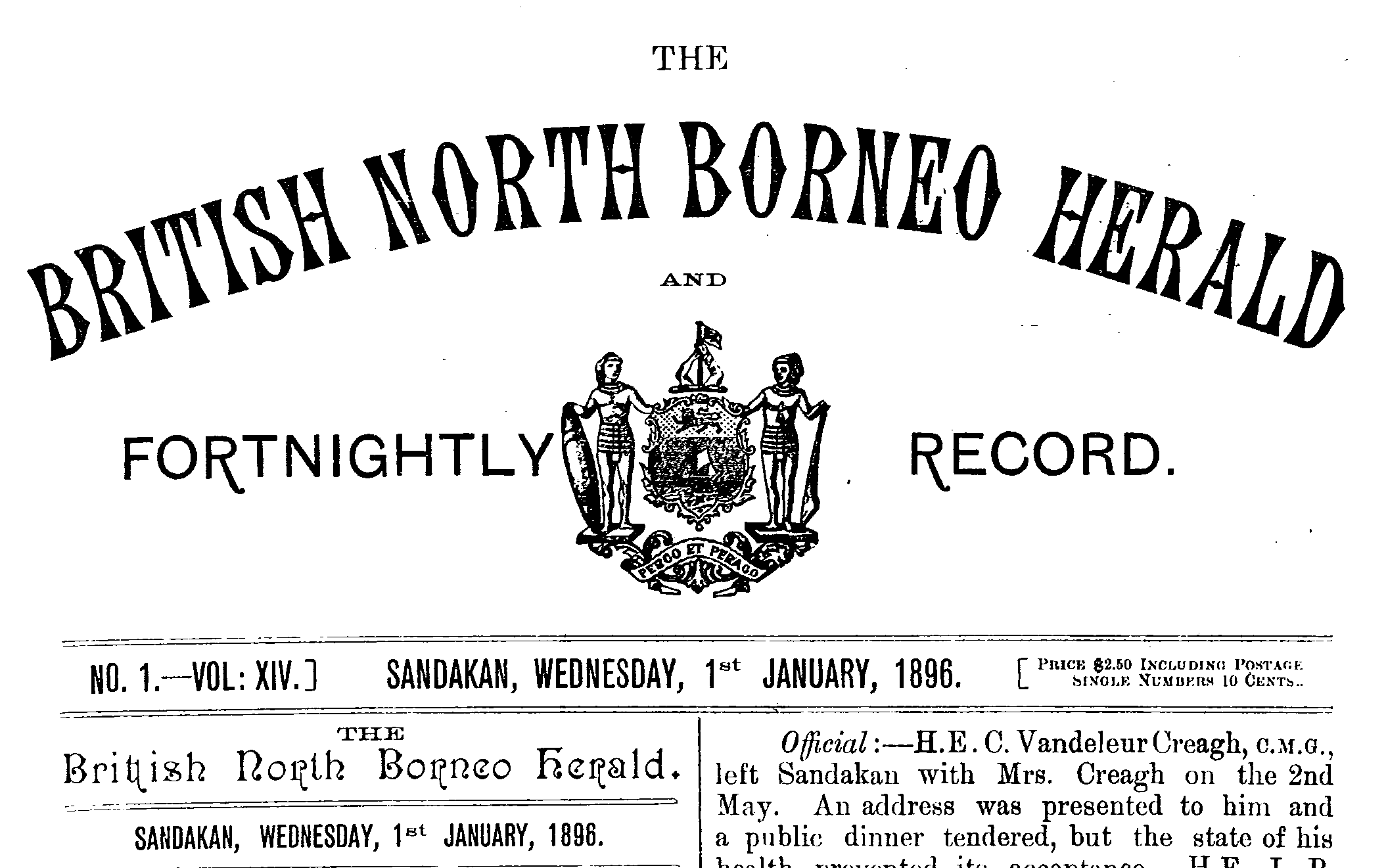
The Herald, title graphic from 1 January 1896 after conversion to 14-daily appearance

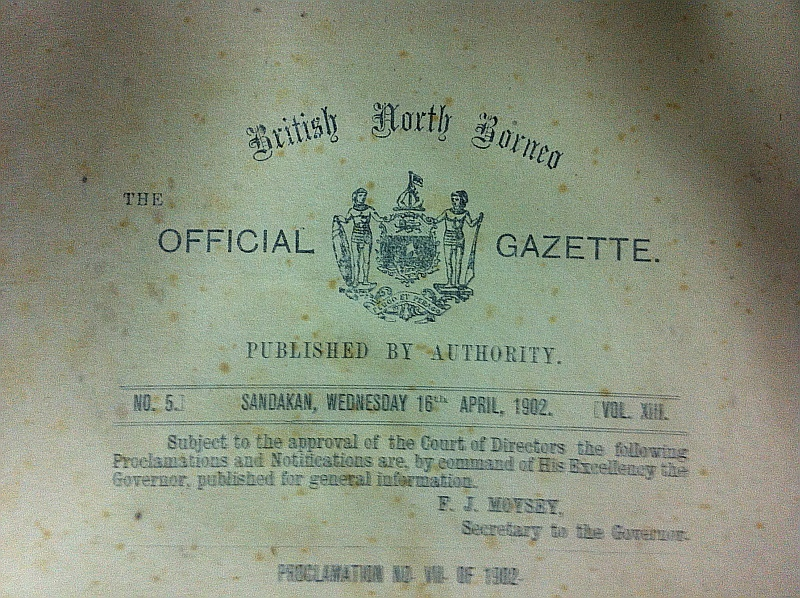
Extract from the title page of the British North Borneo Official Gazette of 16 April 1902

Although the Herald is usually quoted as British North Borneo Herald, its official name has undergone several minor changes:

- British North Borneo Herald and Monthly Record (1 January 1892) (Note: Starting with Volume 1 (1 January 1892) to Volume 7 (1 July 1895).)
- The British North Borneo Herald And Fortnightly Record (1 January 1896)
- British North Borneo Herald and Official Gazette

== Outsourcing of legal texts ==
In accordance with the intention of a governmental news organisation, legislative texts and ordinances had been part of the Herald from the very beginning. Even in the edition of the Herald on 1 April 1885, these were printed in a separate section of the "Gazette". A section "Official Gazette" was established for the editions from 1 May 1885 to 1891. After that, the British North Borneo Official Gazette was continued as an independent governmental advisor.

== Political orientation ==
As a governmental report, the Herald was not a neutral source as it did not publish any information that was detrimental to the image of the North Borneo government (in the form of the Court of London) or to the share price of the North Borneo Chartered Company. In none of these accounts are there any comments on the trench battles between William Clark Cowie and the highly popular Governors Hugh Charles Clifford and Ernest Woodford Birch, who led in both cases the resignation of the governor. Also the inadequacies of the North Borneo Railway, the catastrophic misjudgment regarding the manganese deposits at Marudu Bay in 1907 and the big fire, which destroyed the sawmill of British Borneo Timber in 1934, were not mentioned.

== Used as a reference ==
Herald's archival editions are now available in various libraries in Asia and Europe. Among the periodicals, the Herald, together with The Straits Times and The Singapore Free Press and Mercantile Advertiser (1884–1942) is the most important source of knowledge for the history research on North Borneo and the North Borneo Chartered Company.

Comprehensive original editions of the Herald are in the Sabah State Archives, The National Archives, Kew and the Singapore National Library. However, in contrast to other magazines, the British North Borneo Herald is not digitally developed for public use.
