= Robert Dudley Beeston =

Government official in British North Borneo (1844–1895)

Chief Magistrate of the Sandakan District Court
- In office 4 July 1891 – 7 March 1895
- Appointed by: Charles Vandeleur Creagh

Resident Magistrate at Sandakan
- In office August 1889 – 4 July 1891
- Appointed by: Charles Vandeleur Creagh

4th Commandant of the British North Borneo Constabulary
- In office August 1886 – August 1889
- Appointed by: William Hood Treacher
- Preceded by: John Smith
- Succeeded by: Edward Algernon Barnett

Founding Editor of the British North Borneo Herald
- In office 1883–?
- Appointed by: Rutherford Alcock; William Cowie

Personal details
- Born: 10 January 1844 Crema, Cremona, Lombardia, Italy
- Died: 7 March 1895 (aged 51) Sandakan, North Borneo
- Spouse: Alice Jane Wickey Stable

Military service
- Branch/service: Bengal Army; Bengal Staff Corps; British North Borneo Constabulary
- Rank: Captain
- Battles/wars: Padas Damit War

Robert Dudley Beeston was the first European to discover alluvial gold in North Borneo (present day Sabah), sparking the short-lived North Borneo Gold Rush. He also held many high-ranking government positions in the country, serving as the Commandant of the British North Borneo Constabulary, Superintendent of Gaols, and the Chief magistrate of the Sandakan District Court. He was also the founding editor of the British North Borneo Herald.

== Biography ==
From 1857 to 1873, he served in the Bengal Army. His service in the Army was "wide and varried."

In 1867, he married Alice Stable in Sussex.

=== Australia ===
After his service in the Army, having heard rumors of the Australian gold rushes, Beeston made his way to Gympie and its famous goldfields to prospect. He became well known in Gympie and Queensland, where he served in minor government roles as a clerk in various district offices. By 1876, he had become the Register of the Central District Court of Queensland, District Receiver of Insolvency, and the High Bailiff of Queensland. During the 1870s, he also wrote a regular column for the Telegraph and Examiner.

While he was living in Queensland, and later in Launceston, Tasmania, he produced "some really smart literary work." One of the more famous volumes he worked on was St. Ivo and the Ashes: A Correct, True and Particular History of the Hon. Ivo Bligh's Crusade in Australia. This book was produced primarily to showcase the talents of his illustrator, M. C. B. Massie.

=== North Borneo Gold Rush ===
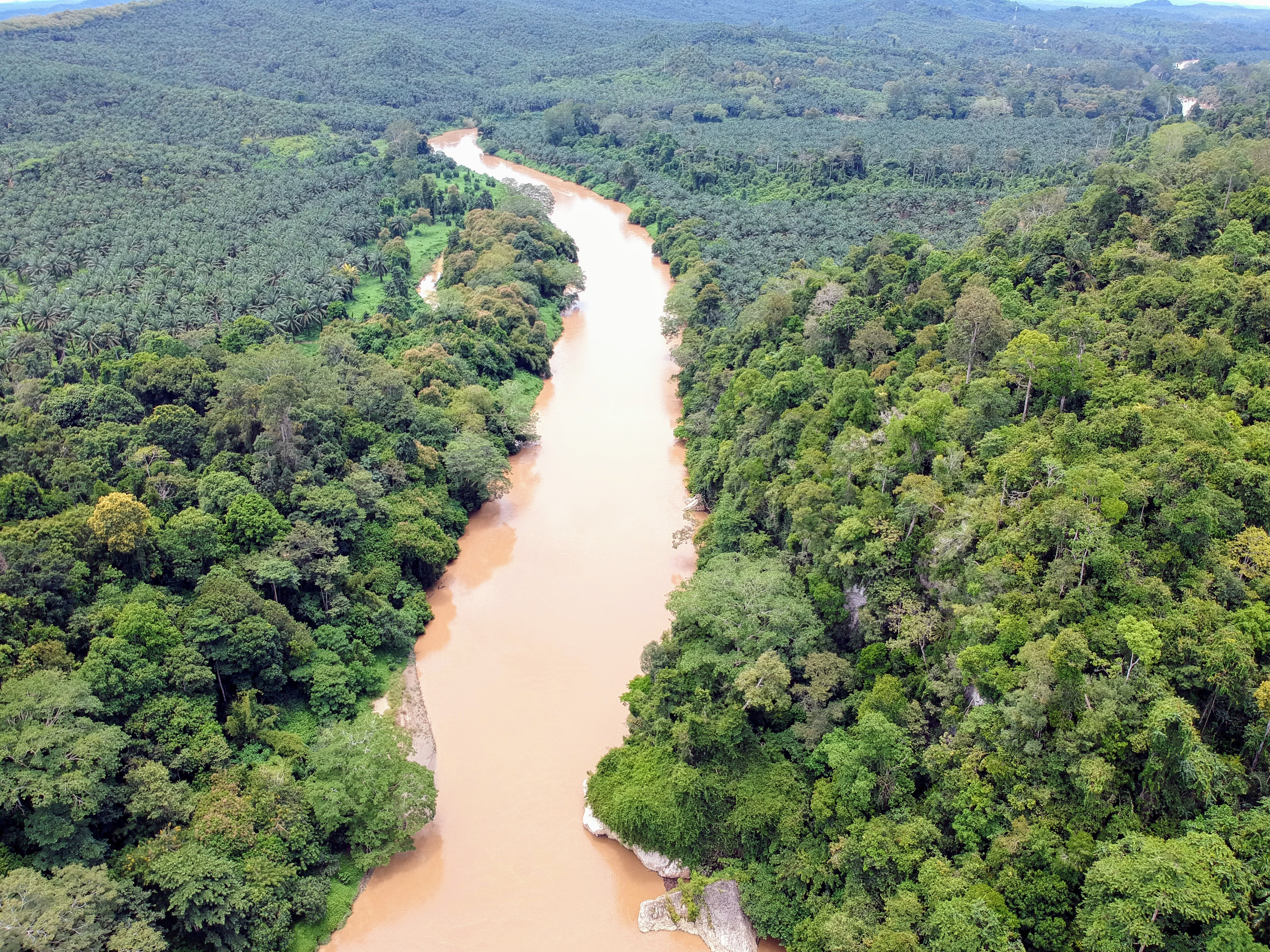
Beeston discovered gold along the Segama River.

In 1883, the North Borneo Chartered Company brought Beeston to their new country of North Borneo for the specific purpose of searching for gold and other minerals. After the death of Frank Hatton on the Segama River in 1883, Beeston was instructed to resume the search on the Segama and its several tributaries. He explored the east coast of North Borneo from the Silam coast in Lahad Datu District to the mouth of the Segama, and went up the Segama over fourteen hours inland by steam launch.

"The Segama country was the wildest part of a wild country, almost uninhabited dense jungle, abounding with leeches ; little or no food was obtainable locally, transport difficulties were enormous ; the rapids were frequent and dangerous and, as often as not, the river was in flood." ~ Owen Rutter

In June 1883, upriver on the Segama, he discovered gold in North Borneo, in an area which would become known as the Segama Gold Fields. In a series of articles on North Borneo he later wrote for the Melbourne Leader, Beeston wrote: "There is a legend that the inhabitants of the upper waters of the river had known of the existence of gold in the country for years; but I lay claim to be the first European who reported it to actually exist."

This claim has even been reiterated by certain historians, such as Owen Rutter, despite the fact that in 1812, an English merchant and trader named John Hunt wrote in a report to Stamford Raffles entitled Sketch of Borneo or Pulo Kalamantan that there were active gold mines throughout Borneo, including in the Tempasuk area, and a rich gold-field in Darvel Bay. Hunt, however, in the same report to Raffles, admits that "Not having had an opportunity to inspect any of the gold mines personally, I know not if the ores readily melt of themselves ... I have... no accurate information on the subject, and can simply note the general fact."

In 1883, Beeston also became the founding editor of the British North Borneo Herald.

Beeston's Report on the Segama Gold Fields was published in Silam, North Borneo on 15 May 1886.

Early in the year of 1886, Beeston was engaged for another expedition to produce a mineralogical and geological report of the east coast. That March, Beeston went upriver along the Segama for three days, beyond Barrier Falls. He didn't find much gold on the trip, only a few flecks, but he did write: "Beyond any question the Darvel Bay district will ere long prove to be one large goldfield." The report he produced from this expedition was entitled Report on the Segama Gold Fields, which was published in Silam on 15 May 1886.

=== British North Borneo Constabulary ===
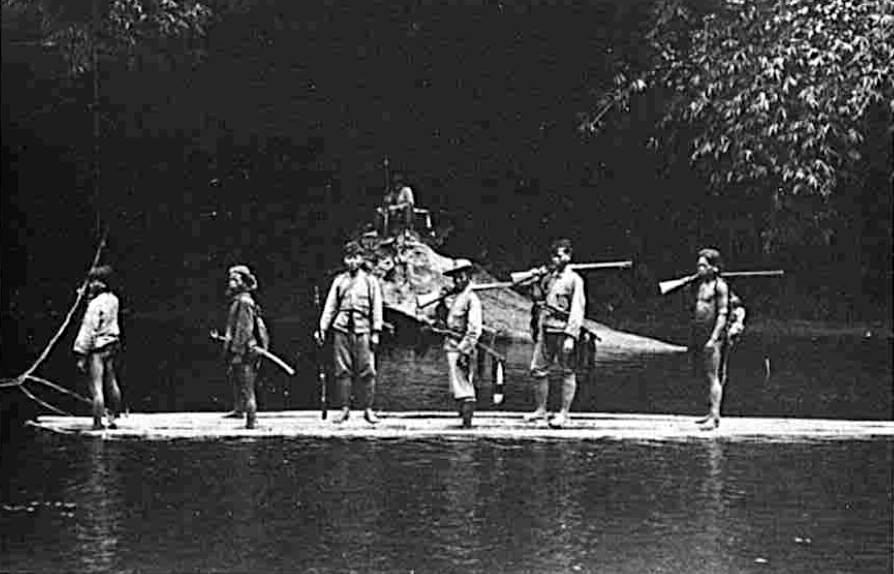
The British North Borneo Constabulary was the sole military and police force of North Borneo.

In August 1886, Beeston became the Commandant of the British North Borneo Constabulary, but due to the poor budget constraints of the Company at Sandakan, he was given several different high-ranking positions simultaneously. On behalf of the government, while serving as the Commandant of the Constabulary, he was also made a sessions judge and served the as Superintendent of Gaols.

On behalf of the company, however, he was still employed as a minerals prospector. It was a little over a year after his appointment as Commandant that Beeston went out again far upriver into the Segama, this time for an eighteen-day expedition with four European miners. They spent twelve days camped at a place they called "Starvation Camp," and found little gold. Sufficient quantities of gold were never found in North Borneo to indicate the source of the alluvial gold that Beeston had discovered on the surface. According to K. G. Tregonning, Beeston was far more preoccupied – by order of the company – in searching for gold than in maintaining the training regimen of a professional police force.

==== Padas Damit War ====
Beeston's lack as a trainer of police made itself evident on 7 December 1888, when Dominick Daniel Daly, the Assistant Resident of Province Dent, launched an expedition into the Padas Damit against Pengiran Shabandar, beginning the first battles of the Padas Damit War. He brought Beeston with him, who, as the Commandant of the Constabulary was in charge of the fighting contingent of 100 men. They were in the pursuit of a man named Patek, a man who had killed his own brother – but the Padas Damit was land that since 1884 the Brunei Pengiran Shabandar claimed did not belong to the company, and was his own land. The expedition was ambushed by a party of over 150 of Shabandar's soldiers. Because Daly had spent so little time training the Constabulary, they were unable to hold their ground. Beeston had a nervous breakdown and was forced to resign from the battlefield.

When he recovered, he was appointed Resident magistrate of Sandakan and Police magistrate, where he continued to serve as the Superintendent of Gaols. His service here lasted until the summer of 1891, when he was made Chief magistrate of the country. His own son-in-law, Alexander Cook, served as the Attorney general.
