= Donald Tregonning =

Donald Tregonning may refer to:

- Don Tregonning (1928–2022), Australian tennis player
- Donald R. C. Tregonning (1893–1935), Australian field hockey player
