= Journal of Southeast Asian Studies =

- Discipline: Southeast Asian studies
- Language: English
- Edited by: Maitrii Aung-Thwin

Publication details
- History: 1960-present
- Publisher: Cambridge University Press on behalf of the National University of Singapore
- Frequency: Quarterly

Standard abbreviations
- ISO 4: J. Southeast Asian Stud.

Indexing
- ISSN: 0022-4634

Links
- Journal homepage; Online access; Online archive

The Journal of Southeast Asian Studies is a peer-reviewed academic journal covering scholarly studies on Southeast Asia (Brunei, Cambodia, Indonesia, Laos, Malaysia, Myanmar, the Philippines, East Timor, Singapore, Thailand and Vietnam). It publishes articles from a wide range of disciplines in the humanities and social sciences. The journal's extensive book review section includes works in Southeast Asian languages.

== History ==
The Journal of Southeast Asian History was founded by K. G. Tregonning in 1960 and was renamed Journal of Southeast Asian Studies in 1969.

== Abstracting and indexing ==
The journal is abstracted and indexed in the International Bibliography of Periodical Literature, International Bibliography of Book Reviews of Scholarly Literature, FRANCIS, Arts and Humanities Citation Index and the Social Sciences Citation Index.
