= Mel Tregonning =

Australian artist

- Born: Melanie Reanna Tregonning; 15 April 1983; Perth, Western Australia, Australia
- Died: 12 or 13 May 2014 (aged 31); Perth, Western Australia, Australia
- Education: Curtin University
- Occupation: Artist
- Notable work: Small Things
- Relatives: Donald R. C. Tregonning (great-great-grandfather); K. G. Tregonning (great-grandfather); Don Tregonning (second cousin, three times removed)
- Website: meltregonning.com.au

Melanie Reanna Tregonning (15 April 1983 – 12 or 13 May 2014) was an Australian artist, best remembered as an author, cartoonist and illustrator. Her graphic novel Small Things, published posthumously in 2016 by Allen & Unwin, was awarded the Gold Ledger in 2017.

== Early life ==
Tregonning was born on 15 April 1983 in Perth, Western Australia. She is a descendant of the British-Australian army officer Donald R. C. Tregonning and of the historian K. G. Tregonning. Her second cousin three times removed was the tennis player Don Tregonning.

== Artistic career ==
Tregonning studied graphic design at Curtin University, graduating in 2004. During her time at university, the Japanese-Australian anthology Xuan Xuan published a serialized version of Tregonning's Toy. In 2009, Gestalt published Tregonning's graphic short story Night.

=== Small Things ===
From 2013, Tregonning worked on a wordless graphic novel dealing with the themes of anxiety and depression. She died before she could finish the novel. After her death, Shaun Tan helped to complete the graphic novel and Small Things was published by Allen & Unwin in 2016 to critical acclaim. The Sydney Morning Herald included Small Things in its list of the best books for young readers in 2016 and The Guardian's columnist Lucy Mangan lauded the graphic novel as "stunning". In 2017, the book was awarded the Gold Ledger in the Ledger Awards and, in 2019, the United States Board on Books for Young People recognized Small Things in its Outstanding International Books List.

== Notable works ==
=== Serialized comics ===
- Toy (Xuan Xuan, 2003–2004)

=== Graphic novels and short stories ===
- Night (Gestalt, 2009)
- Small Things (Allen & Unwin, 2016)

== Death ==
Some time before her death, Tregonning came to believe that human intellectual development had plateaued and that the human species was unlikely to continue to make great advances in learning and innovation in the future. This conviction caused her emotional distress, "mourning the loss of what humans will never become." Following an episode of acute depression, Tregonning ended her life in May 2014.

A coroner's inquest into Tregonning's death found that underfunding and "systemic failures" in the mental health system had contributed to her not being provided with adequate mental health care. Immediately before her death, Tregonning had unsuccessfully sought help from different health professionals. The coroner conducting the inquest into Tregonning's death, Sarah Linton, issued a formal recommendation to the Minister for Health that a review of "the mental health service provided at public hospitals" be conducted.
