= Sabah State Archives =

Government archives in Malaysia

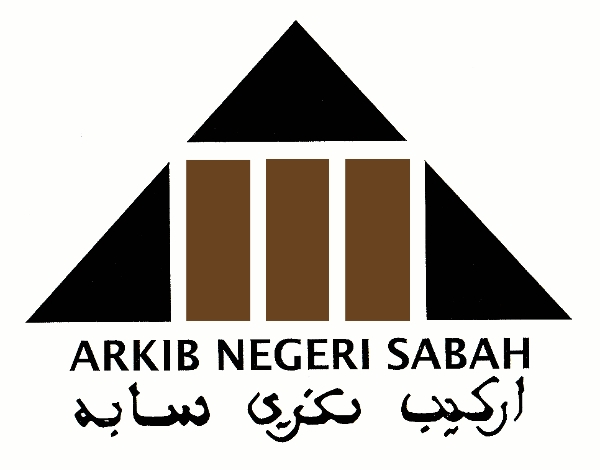

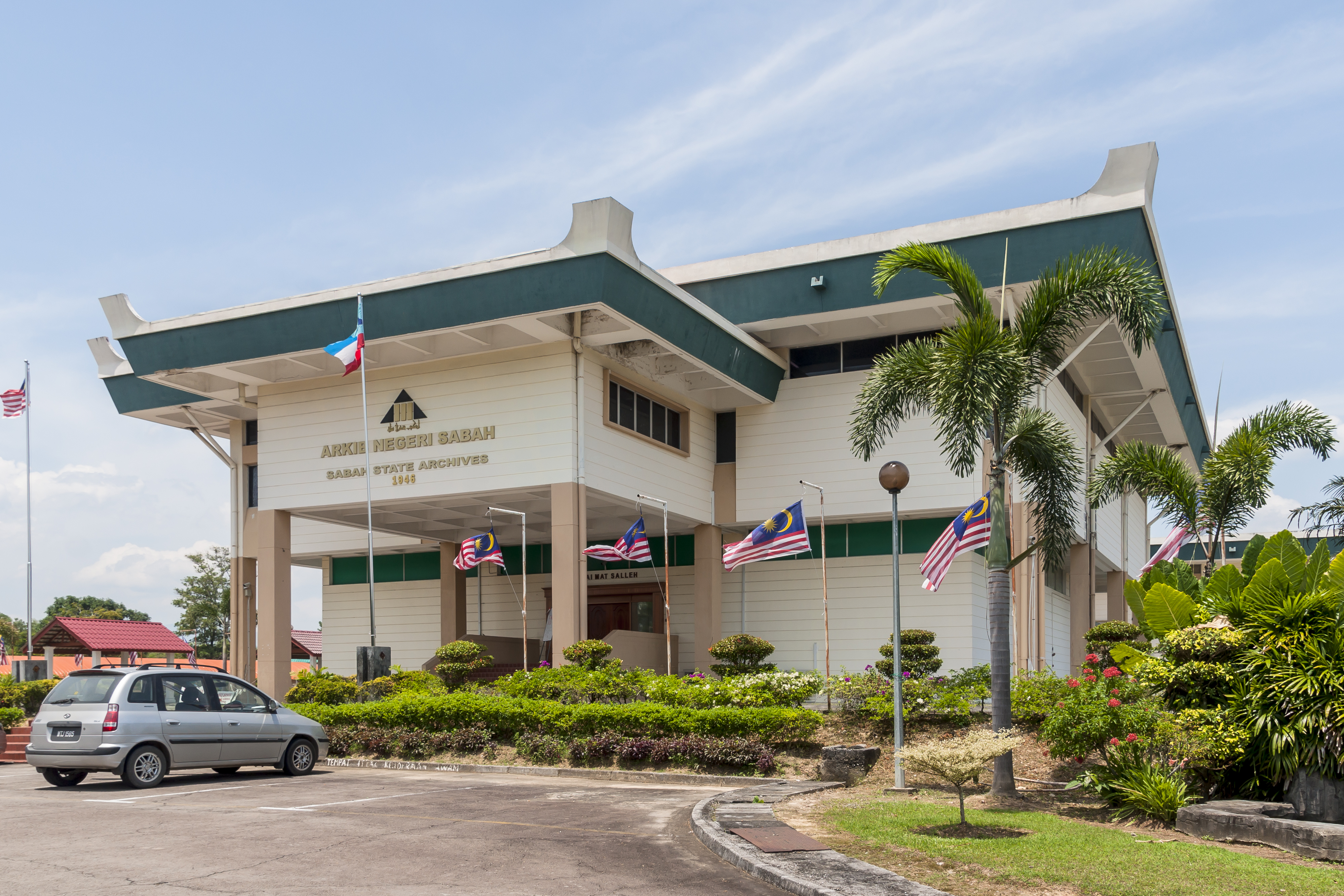

Agency overview
- Formed: 15 July 1946
- Jurisdiction: Sabah
- Agency executive: Director; Deputy Director; Heads
- Website: https://archive.sabah.gov.my

The Sabah State Archives (ANS) are the official government archives in the Malaysian state of Sabah. Founded in 1946, they are the fifth-oldest state archives in Southeast Asia. They were formed during the British Military Administration of Borneo, under Brigadier General Charles Frederick Cunningham Macaskie, and officially established under the Crown Colony of North Borneo. Their scope includes the ancient and prehistory of Sabah, and the history of the Majapahit, the Sultanate of Brunei, North Borneo, Japanese North Borneo, the Crown Colony, and modern Sabah.

== See also ==
- The National Archives (United Kingdom)
- Sabah Museum
- Mat Sator Museum
