= Tregoning =

Tregoning is a surname. Notable people with the surname include:

- Frank Tregoning, American shipyard owner who built motorboat that later served in the US Navy as USS Sans Souci II (SP-301)
- Grant Tregoning (born 1988), New Zealand international speedway rider
- Ian Tregoning, music producer and co-founder of Do It Records
- Max Tregoning, co-founder of Do It Records, brother of the above
- Jack Tregoning (1919–1989), Australian first-class cricketer
- John Tregoning (1840s–1920s), American mechanical engineer and author
- Joseph E. Tregoning (1941–2019), American politician and former member of the Wisconsin State Assembly
- Larry Tregoning, captain of the 1964–65 Michigan Wolverines men's basketball team
- Marcus Tregoning (born 1959), horse racing jockey and trainer
- Nick Tregoning, Liberal Democrat candidate in Wales

== See also ==
- Tregonning (disambiguation)
