= Mat Sator Museum =

- Muzium Mat Sator
- Established: 3 July 2017
- Location: Tambunan District, Sabah
- Coordinates: 5°43′15.91″N 116°24′3.518″E
- Type: Museum
- Owner: Sabah Museum

Muzium Mat Sator (Malay: Muzium Mat Sator) is a museum in Old Kapayan Village in Tambunan District of Sabah, Malaysia. It is named after the follower and chief lieutenant of Mat Salleh, Mat Sator. The museum is located around 122-metre from the area of the Fort of Mat Salleh.

== History ==
The museum was constructed in the area of a former main fort of Mat Sator as a remembrance to the sacrifice of Mat Salleh's chief lieutenant, Mat Sator who put much efforts to protect Mat Salleh Fort in Tibabar during the local conflict against the North Borneo Chartered Company. The fort is strategically located north from Mat Salleh Fort near a river called Sunsuron. Mat Sator Fort was frequently visited by the wife of Mat Salleh, Dang Bandang including Mat Salleh himself. His wife sad said by the local people to have possessed supernatural powers which can alter any corn grain into 'killer bee' or a normal bee which believed to have slowly prevented the fall of the fort including Mat Salleh Fort. When the British successfully destroyed other smaller forts in Piasau, Toboh and Kalansatan villages, the fort of Mat Sator was finally destroyed on 21 January 1900. Through the ensuing conflicts, Mat Salleh together with around 1,000 indigenous Dusun and 300 Bajau were killed on 31 January 1900 with the fort were entirely destroyed by continuous shelling. Mat Sator however survived and on 28 April 1900, they gathered around 300–400 followers and moving north to attack the British settlement in Kudat. Despite managing to overtake the settlement, they were soon overwhelmed by the counter-attack of the British and Mat Sator was finally killed in action. The current museum built in the location of his former fort was opened and officiated by Deputy Chief Minister Joseph Pairin Kitingan on 3 July 2017 under the support of Sabah Museum Department.

== Features ==
The museum exhibits various photographs and a host of local handicrafts and samples of varieties of bamboo species native to the Tambunan District. The exterior of the museum building adorned with replicas of traditional gongs. Photos of Sabah's iconic artistes and athletes (including the late Gabuh Piging), a Tambunan-born triple jumper who represented North Borneo in the 1956 Summer Olympics in Melbourne, Australia are also among the exhibits.

== See also ==
- List of museums in Malaysia
