= William Maunder Crocker =

Managing Director of North Borneo Chartered Company

William Maunder Crocker (born 1843 Devon, England – died 1899 Surrey, England) was an administrator in Borneo.

== Education ==
Crocker was educated at a private school in Plymouth.

== Career ==
In 1864, Crocker joined the Sarawak civil service, eventually deputising for the Rajah, although from 1870–1874 he was involved in business, operating a sago factory at Mukah, during which time he wrote the first published account of a visit to Niah Great Cave

In 1887, as the Managing Director of the North Borneo Chartered Company, he became Acting Governor of British North Borneo, but only for a year. The Crocker Range in Sabah, Borneo is now named after him.

== Personal life ==
William Maunder Crocker was born in South Tawton, on the north edge of Dartmoor, the son of Emanuel, a tailor, and Susan. He was married in London in 1878. He died in Surrey, England in 1899.
