= Segama River =

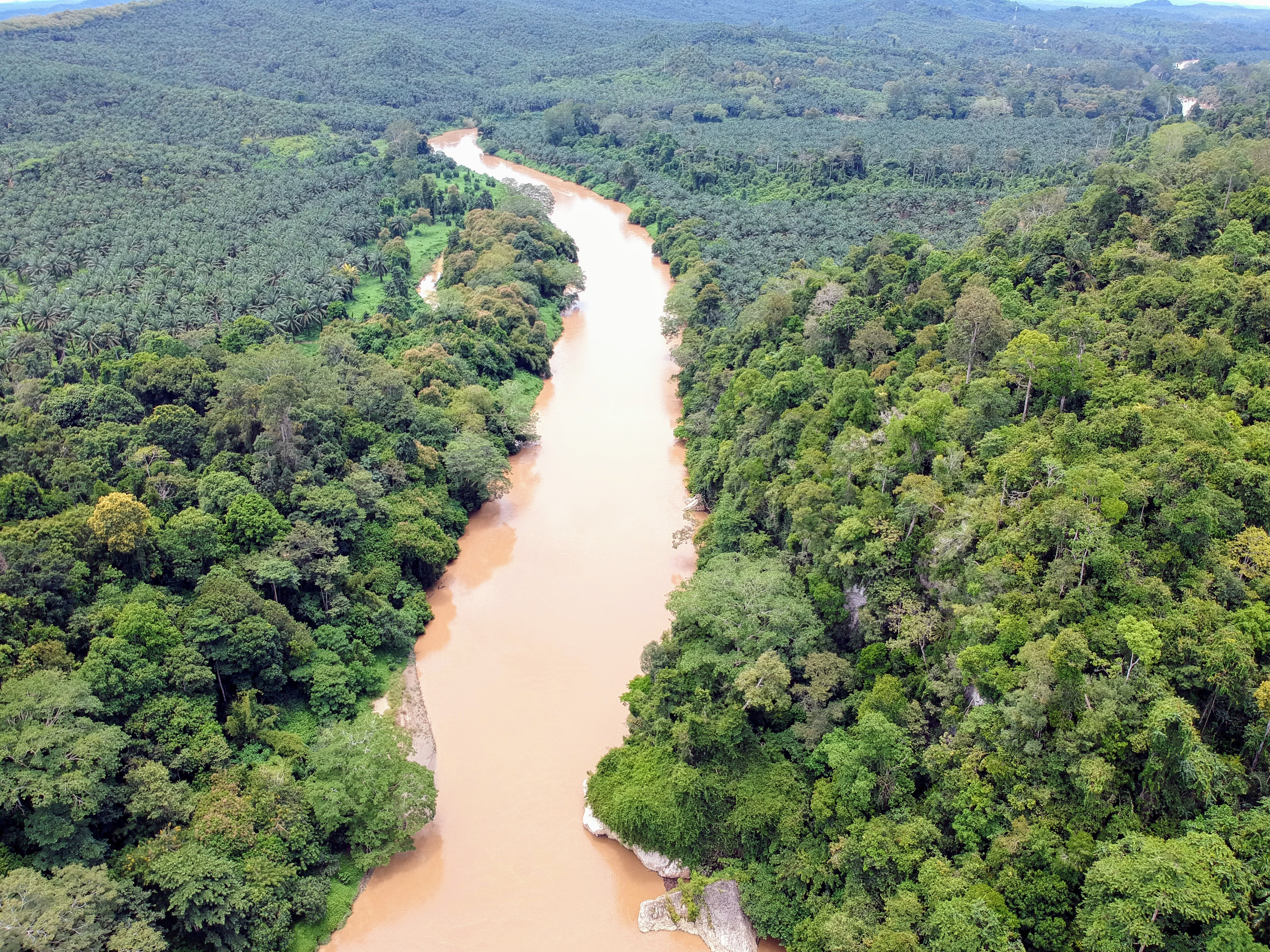

Location
- Country: Sabah, Malaysia

Physical characteristics
- Source
  - coordinates: wdfsdf
- Mouth
  - coordinates: 5.49662°N 118.808727°E

The Segama River, (Malay: Sungai Segama) is a river in Sabah, a state of Malaysia in the Northeastern tip of the island of Borneo. The river occupies the southern edge of the Danum Valley Conservation Area. The Segama is often mistakenly labeled as the Danum River, which is a different river lying on the northern edge of the DVCA because part of it passes through the Danum Valley. In 2005 and 2006, Borneo elephants were found along the river's catchment basin.

== North Borneo Gold Rush ==
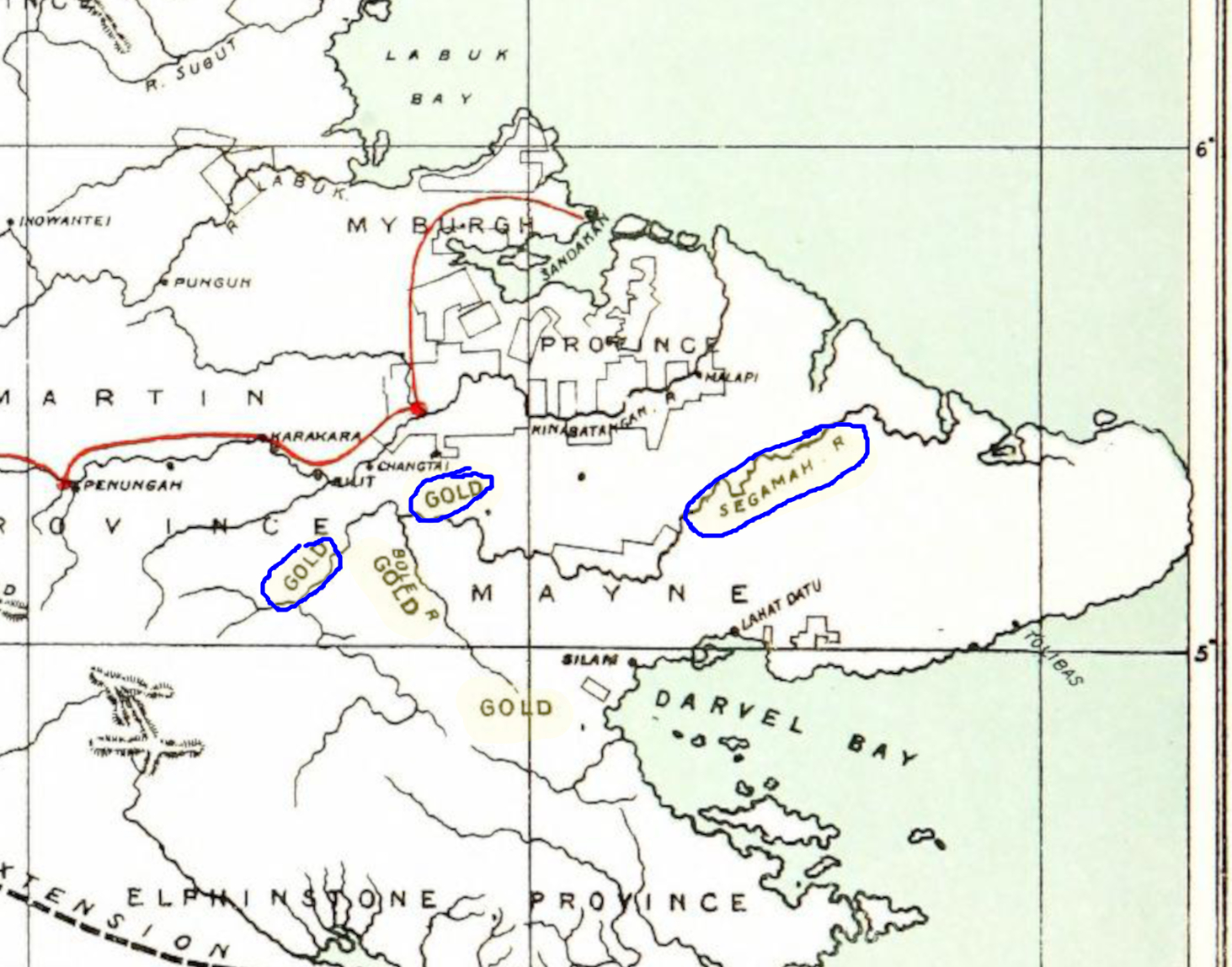
Segama River and the Segama Goldfields highlighted on the 1899 map of North Borneo.

The North Borneo Gold Rush occurred after Robert Dudley Beeston and H. Walker discovered gold along the Segama River. The area where this discovery occurred was known as the Segama Goldfields.
