= K. G. Tregonning =

British-Australian historian

K. G. Tregonning MBE FRAS
- Born: Kennedy Gordon Phillip Tregonning; 13 June 1923; Perth, Western Australia, Australia
- Died: 20 July 2015 (aged 92)
- Education: Christ Church Grammar School; Hale School
- Alma mater: University of Adelaide; New College, Oxford
- Father: Donald R. C. Tregonning
- Relatives: Don Tregonning (second cousin)

Military service
- Allegiance: Australia, United Kingdom
- Branch/service: Royal Australian Air Force, Royal Navy Volunteer Reserve
- Years of service: 1941-1946
- Rank: Sub-Lieutenant
- Battles/wars: World War II

Kennedy Gordon Phillip Tregonning MBE FRAS (13 June 1923 - 20 July 2015) was an Australian historian, journalist, headmaster and officer in the Royal Australian Air Force and Royal Navy. From 1958 to 1966, he was Raffles Professor of History at the University of Malaya in Singapore.

== Early life ==
Tregonning was born in Perth, Western Australia on 13 June 1923, the son of a British-Australian army officer and physician Donald R. C. Tregonning and his wife Florence Agar. He was educated at Christ Church Grammar School and at Hale School. In 1941, Tregonning volunteered to join the Second Australian Imperial Force, serving first in the army and then as an officer in the Royal Australian Air Force. Tregonning saw active service as a bomber pilot stationed in England. He later joined the Royal Navy, serving in British Malaya.

After the Second World War, Tregonning returned to Australia for his university studies at the University of Adelaide, where he was a student of the historian G. V. Portus. Tregonning graduated with a double first in political science and history in 1949. He then went to New College, Oxford, where he studied the history of the British North Borneo Company. While at Oxford, Tregonning was a Nuffield Foundation Dominion Scholar, conducting research at the Colonial Office. He graduated in 1953.

== Academic career ==
Following his studies at Adelaide and Oxford, Tregonning traveled to Singapore, in 1953, to take up a position as a lecturer in the history department of the University of Malaya in Singapore. In 1958, he succeeded the naval historian C. Northcote Parkinson in the Raffles Chair of History at the University of Singapore, named for Sir Stamford Raffles.

During his time in Singapore, Tregonning established the Journal of Southeast Asian History in 1960, published by Cambridge University Press. He also published several books, including A History of Modern Sabah (North Borneo, 1881-1963) and The British in Malaya: The First Forty Years 1786-1826. Sponsored by the Colonial Office as part of the Corona Library, Tregonning's North Borneo was published by Her Majesty's Stationery Office in 1960 with a foreword by Sir Winston Churchill. Correspondents of Tregonning at the time included Lee Kuan Yew, Jawaharlal Nehru, Habib Bourguiba, and Norodom Sihanouk. His students in Singapore included the diplomats Chiang Hai Ding and Wong Lin Ken.

In 1967, Tregonning returned to Australia to the position of headmaster at Hale School. His students there included the diplomat John King Atkins, the Australian Army general Daniel McDaniel, and the composer Ash Gibson Greig. From 1980 Tregonning served as the general editor of the University of Queensland Press's Leaders in Asia Series. After retiring from Hale School in 1988, Tregonning was appointed to the Official Corruption Committee on which he served until 1993.

Tregonning also worked in an advisory capacity for the Australian Senate's Standing Committee on Foreign Affairs and Defence and was a board member of the West Australian Ballet.

== Personal life ==
The tennis player Don Tregonning was his second cousin.

== Works ==
- Tregonning, K.G. (1958). Under Chartered Company Rule: North Borneo, 1881-1946. University of Malaya Press.
- Tregonning, K.G. (1960). North Borneo. Her Majesty's Stationery Office.
- Tregonning, K.G. (1964). A History of Modern Malaya. University of London Press.
- Tregonning, K.G. (1965). A History of Modern Sabah: North Borneo, 1881–1963. University of Malaya Press.
- Tregonning, K.G. (1989). Home Port Singapore: An Australian Historian's Experience. Centre for the Study of Australia-Asia Relations, Griffith University. ISBN 978-0-86857-276-5.
- Tregonning, K.G. (1993). Young Hearts Run Free: Hale School 1858-1988. Hale School.
- Tregonning, K.G. (2010). Merdeka and Much More: The Reminiscences of a Raffles Professor, 1953-67. National University of Singapore Press. ISBN 978-9971694227.
