= Omadal Island =

Island in Malaysia

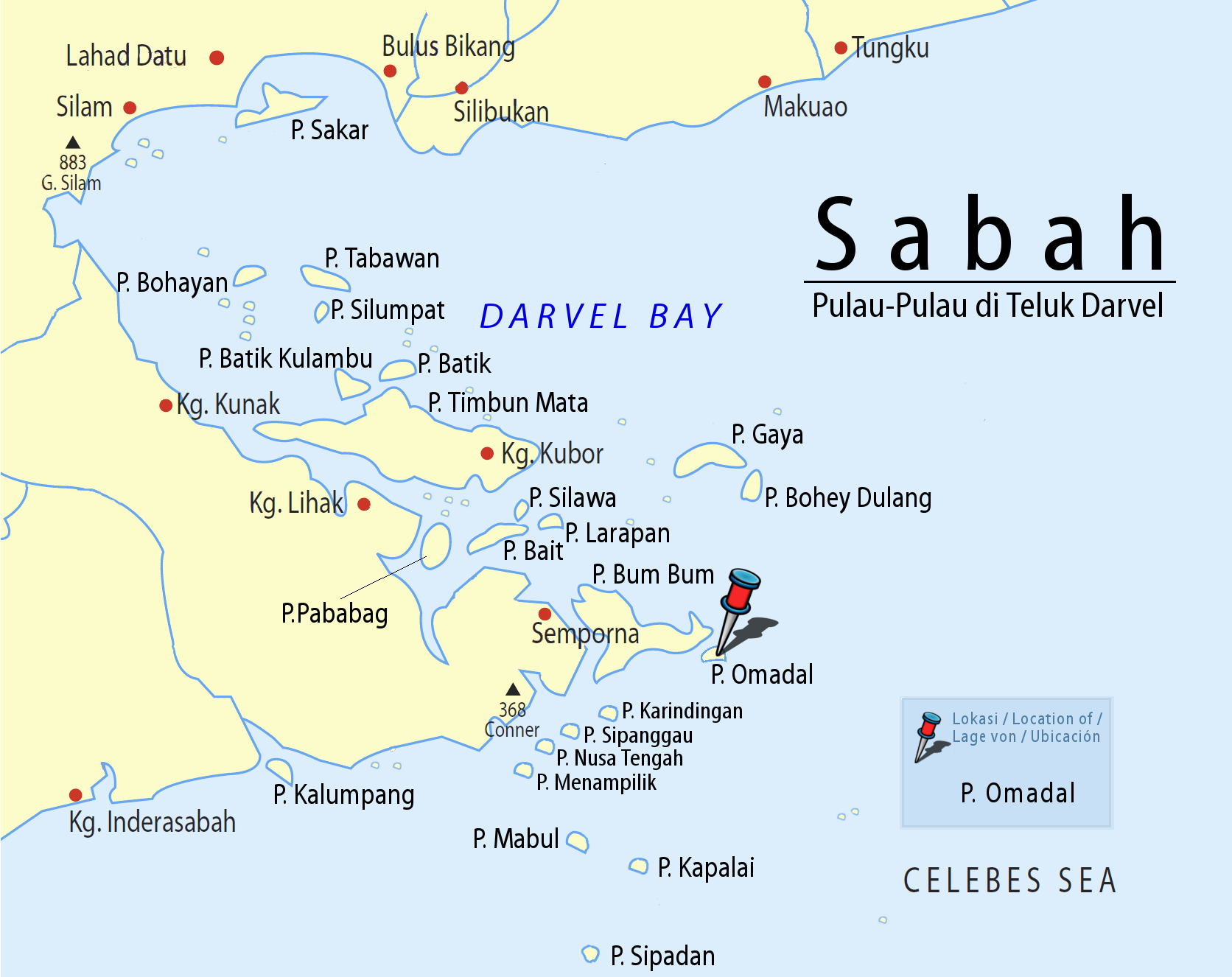
- Location of Omadal Island in Darvel Bay
- Interactive map of Omadal Island

Geography
- Coordinates: 4°25′0″N 118°45′0″E

Administration
- Malaysia
- State: Sabah
- Division: Tawau
- District: Semporna

Omadal Island (Malay: Pulau Omadal) is a Malaysian island located in the Celebes Sea on the state of Sabah.

== Demographics ==
The island is populated on the western tip, facing the neighboring island of Pulau Bum Bum; mainly by Bajau. In addition to fishing, the cultivation and extraction of seaweed has recently become a source of income for the local population.

== See also ==
- List of islands of Malaysia
