= Charles Vandeleur Creagh =

Governor of North Borneo (1842–1917)

Charles Vandeleur Creagh CMG (4 October 1842 – 18 September 1917) was Governor of North Borneo from 1888 to 1895.

== Career ==
Creagh was educated at the Royal Naval School, New Cross and Eastman’s Royal Naval Academy at Southsea. He was a barrister at the Middle Temple.

Creagh spent many years in government service in Hong Kong and is recorded as Acting Captain Superintendent of Police in 1867.

He posted as the Assistant Resident of Perak, Governor of North Borneo (1888–1895) and Governor and Commander-in-Chief, Labuan (1891–1895).

== Personal life ==
Charles Vandeleur Creagh was the second son of Captain John Creagh, RN of Cahirbane Co. Clare, Ireland. His younger brother became General O'Moore Creagh VC GCB GCSI (1848–1923).

Creagh married Blanche Frances Edwardes (1858–1948), daughter of Captain Frederick Augustus Edwardes (1829–1878) of Rhyd-y-gors in June 1882. Their elder son became Rear-Admiral James Vandeleur Creagh DSO (1883–1956). Their younger son went on to become Second Lieutenant O'Moore Charles Creagh (1896–1918) of the Royal Field Artillery, who was killed in action during the German Spring Offensive at Feuillaucourt, near Mont Saint-Quentin, on 23 March 1918, aged 21. They also had a daughter Dorothy Creagh.

== Contributions ==
He donated his collection of Bornean plants to Kew Gardens.

== Honours and legacy ==
He was made a CMG in 1890. The Bauhinia Creaghi Baker, a Caesalpiniaceae family plant species, was named after him as was the Creagh Road in Taiping.

Coat of arms of Charles Vandeleur Creagh

Notes
Granted 1 May 1914 by Nevile Rodwell Wilkinson, Ulster King of Arms.
Crest
A horse's head erased Argent caparisoned Gules in the headstall of the bridle a laurel branch Vert and charged on the neck for distinction with a trefoil of the last.
Torse
Of the colours.
Escutcheon
Argent on a chevron Gules between three laurel branches Vert a trefoil Or on a chief Azure three bezants.
Motto
Virtute Et Numine

== Sources ==
- Victor Plarr, Men and Women of the Time: A Dictionary of Contemporaries, 1899
- Edmund Burke, The Annual Register, 1918
- Ray Desmond, Dictionary of British and Irish Botanists and Horticulturists: Including Plant Collectors, Flower Painters and Garden Designers, 1977
- Bauhinia Creaghi Baker

Government offices
Preceded by William Maunder Crocker; Acting	Governor of North Borneo; 1888–1895	Succeeded by Leicester Paul Beaufort
