= Donald R. C. Tregonning =

British-Australian army officer, physician and sportsman

Donald R. C. Tregonning FRCS FRACS
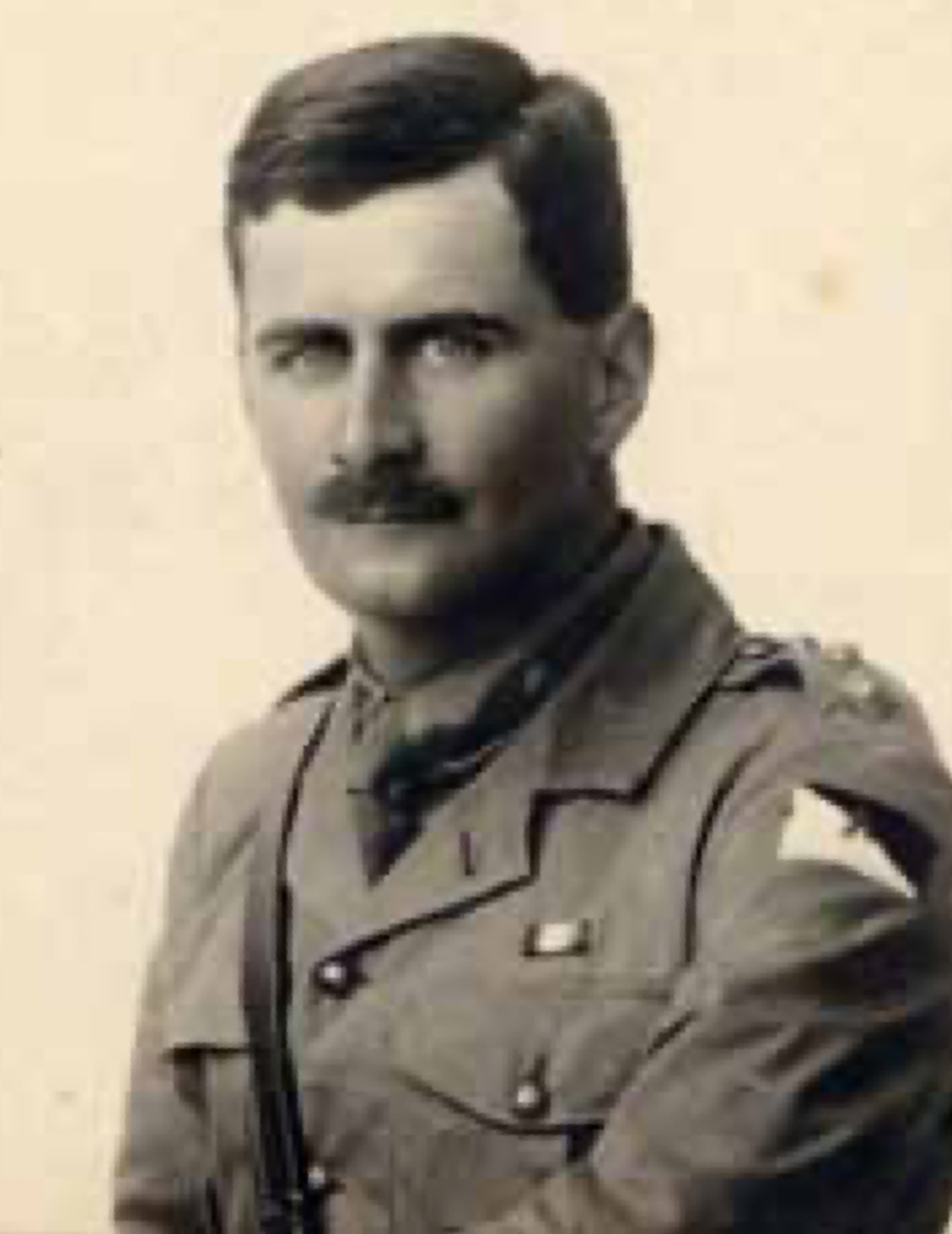
- Born: 1893; Hawthorn, Colony of Victoria
- Died: 5 August 1935 (aged 41–42); Claremont, Western Australia, Australia
- Other name: 'Trigger'
- Education: Scotch College, Melbourne
- Alma mater: The University of Melbourne
- Children: 3, including K. G. Tregonning
- Relatives: Don Tregonning (first cousin, once removed)
- Sports career
- Sport: Field hockey
- University team: Melbourne University Hockey Club
- Team: Australian National Field Hockey Team

Military service
- Allegiance: Australia
- Branch/service: Australian Army
- Rank: Captain
- Unit: Royal Australian Army Medical Corps
- Battles/wars: First World War; Gallipoli Campaign

Donald Rupert Charles Tregonning (1893 – 5 August 1935) was a British-Australian army officer, physician and sportsman, who is best remembered as a yachtsman and hockey player. He was president of the Australian Hockey Association and the first captain of the Australian national field hockey team.

== Early life and education ==
The son of William John Tregonning and Marian Louisa Tregonning, née Kennedy he was born in 1893 in the Melbourne suburb of Hawthorn in the British Colony of Victoria. Tregonning was educated at Scotch College and then studied medicine at the University of Melbourne. His university studies were interrupted by the Great War and he resumed his studies after he was sent back to Melbourne. He graduated in 1916.

== Career ==
=== Military ===
During World War I, Tregonning was a volunteer in the Australian Imperial Force, serving with the 1st Light Horse Field Ambulance in Egypt and at Gallipoli. Following the evacuation of Gallipoli, Tregonning was sent back to Melbourne. After the War, Tregonning attained the rank of Captain in the Royal Australian Army Medical Corps.

=== Sporting ===
Tregonning was an active competitor in yachting, motor car racing, and shooting. While at Scotch College he won the inter-school competition in target shooting. He was a member of the Royal Perth Yacht Club and the owner of the cruiser Roma, winning the Governor's Cup Race.

==== Field hockey ====
In 1922, Tregonning formed a hockey team which later became the Suburban Lion's Hockey Club. Six years later, in 1928, Tregonning was appointed the first captain of the Western Australian state field hockey team. In 1929, he was the president of the Australian Hockey Association, the governing body of hockey in Australia. Tregonning was appointed the inaugural captain of the Australian national team in 1932.

== Personal life ==
In 1918, Tregonning married Florence Agar, daughter of John Agar, of Brandlesholme Hall, at Christ Church, Perth. Their son K. G. Tregonning became a historian and held the Raffles Chair of History at the University of Malaya in Singapore. Other notable relatives of Tregonning include the artist Mel Tregonning, who is his great-great-granddaughter, and the tennis player Don Tregonning, his first cousin once removed.

Tregonning was a specialist in gynaecological surgery and a general practitioner in Perth, Western Australia. He died of pneumonia in 1935, aged 42.

== Legacy ==
In his memory, the Tregonning Trophy, a bronze statue of Tregonning, is presented to the winning team of the annual hockey match between Christ Church Grammar School and Hale School.

The home ground of the Suburban Lion's Hockey Club at Tregonning Fields, Highview Park in Perth are named for Tregonning.
