= William Cowie (merchant) =

Chairman of British North Borneo Company (1849–1910)

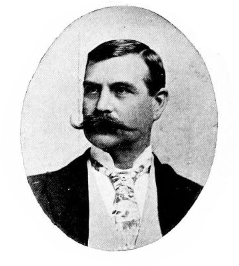
- Cowie.
- Born: 8 April 1849; Friockheim, Forfarshire
- Died: 14 September 1910 (aged 61); Bad Nauheim

William Clark Cowie (8 April 1849 – 14 September 1910) was a Scottish engineer, mariner, and businessman who helped establish British North Borneo and was Chairman of the British North Borneo Company.

== Personal life ==
Born on 8 April 1849, Cowie was the oldest of four children of the flax producer David Cowie (1825–1896) and Ann Cowie (1819–1906) in Scotland, where his mother ancestors had lived for generations. His three siblings were Mary, Andson and Edward.

The family moves to Arbroath on the Scottish east coast. His father was a director in the Wardmill Works of M.C. Thomson & Co., and Cowie trained as an engineer. He received private lessons with the aim of following his grandfather, an engineer in one of the first mills in Scotland.

Around 1873, Cowie married Flora Davidson. They had two children; Flora de Cruz (born 1874) and William Anson Edward Cowie de Cruz (born 1875). His wife died suddenly, aged 25, shortly after the birth of their second child. Cowie then married Amy Constance Pead, and they had two children; Muara Gladys (born 1888) and Andson Gordon (born 1891).

== Career until 1878 ==
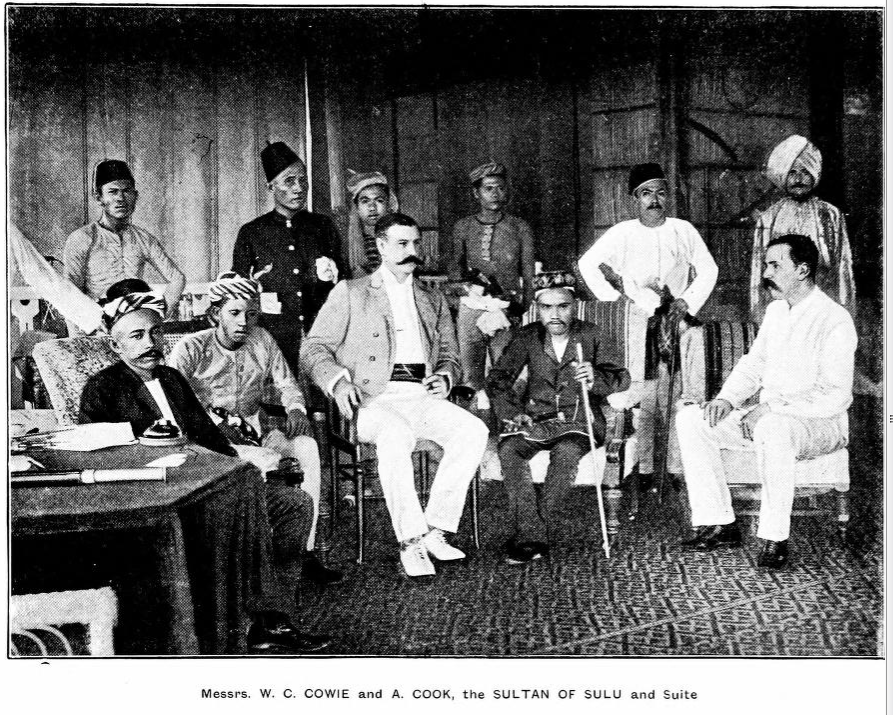
Cowie with the Sultan of Sulu.

From April 1870, Cowie was hired as the chief engineer of Argyle under Captain Peter Orr and left Glasgow for Singapore on his 21st birthday. He then began to lead life as an adventurer in the pirate-infested waters of the Malay Archipelago. His career as chief engineer for Argyle ended at the end of 1872 when he was hired by Carl Schomburgk as captain of the Far East, and was commissioned to break the Spanish naval blockade to deal with the Sultan of Sulu, who ruled parts of the northern Borneo. His successful efforts forged a deep friendship with the Sultan of Sulu.

Cowie convinced the Sultan that to achieve a lasting success in overcoming the Spanish blockade he would need access to a safe harbour; from there he could wait until the shipping route to Sulu was free from Spanish warships. The Sultan permitted Cowie to build a port for his goods at Timbang Island in Sandakan, creating a British presence in Borneo. Cowie, along with two friends – Carl Schomburgk and John Dill Ross – founded the Labuan Trading Company, whose main task was to evade the Spanish naval blockade and bring weapons, opium, tobacco and goods to Sulu. No company ships were ever caught by the Spaniards.

== North Borneo Chartered Company ==
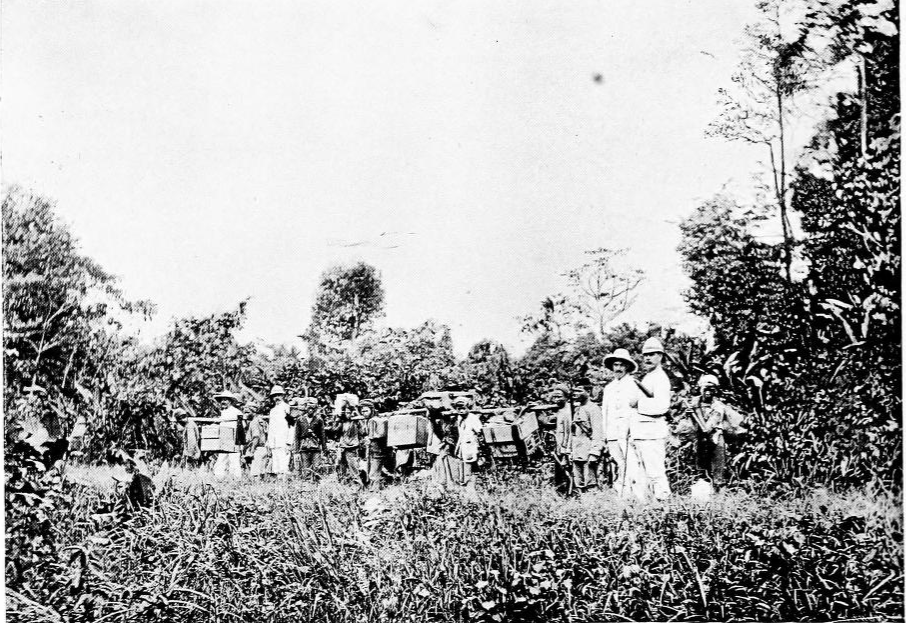
Cowie and party travelling beyond the railway limit in North Borneo.

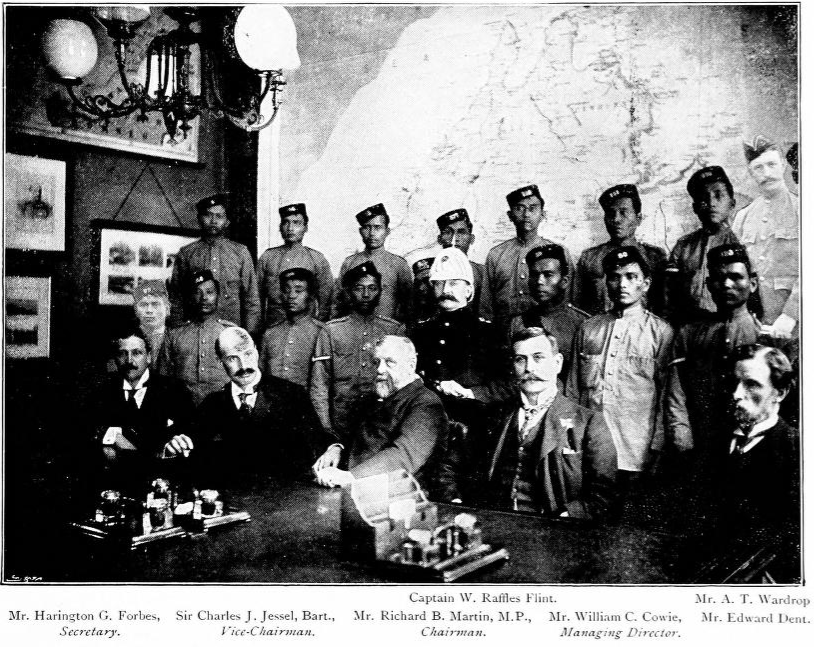
Cowie with officials of the British North Borneo Company.

In 1878, Baron von Overbeck and Alfred Dent approached Cowie knowing he has friendly with the Sultan of Sulu, asking for help in arranging land concessions in Borneo. Cowie agreed as he had plans to occupy territory as part of the British Empire. As the political situation was favourable to unilateral treaties, Cowie told the Sultan to leave the Spaniards to his country, helping foreign powers to take parts of the Sultan territory while expecting the Spanish would wish to avoid diplomatic involvement with the interests of other colonial powers. Cowie managed to get the Sultan to surrender his lands in north-eastern Borneo on 22 January 1878 for an annual payment of £1,000; which was later given to Overbeck and Dent as they received the full power of government and territorial rights to the possessions in Borneo, including the islands. The rights from this treaty were then transferred to the newly-founded British North Borneo Company in 1881.

In March 1882, Cowie purchased a 40 year-concession for the exploitation of coal fields in Muara in Brunei and founded Cowie Brothers, based in Singapore. From Labuan, he rented a shipyard for 99 years from which he shipped his coal. On 12 July 1887, Cowie handed over his franchise rights to the British North Borneo Company and returned with his family to England. Charles Brooke, who later acquired the mine, renamed it as "Brooketon" (today's Brooke Town).

In 1887, Cowie, together with Edmund Ernest Everett, was commissioned to conduct the company's business in Borneo. Due to the lack of transportation to move goods in the island, Cowie sought a concession to build a rail network from the West Coast Division to Sandakan. The company initially agreed and appointed Cowie as the Supervisory Board in 1894. In 1896 construction of the North Borneo Railway began but financial difficulties prevented the company fully connecting to northern Borneo; Cowie was unable to raise the necessary funds especially after company officials refused to borrow more money.

In 1893, under the patronage of Cowie and his brother Andson, a dictionary for the Sulu and Malay languages was created.

He was appreciated for his extensive knowledge of the territory and the people of Borneo. He rose to the position of Director General in 1897. In North Borneo in 1898 he met with Mat Salleh to bring an indefinite solution of the so-called Mat Salleh Rebellion. On 15 October 1909, after the retirement of Charles Jessel, he became Chairman of the Supervisory Board.

== Death ==
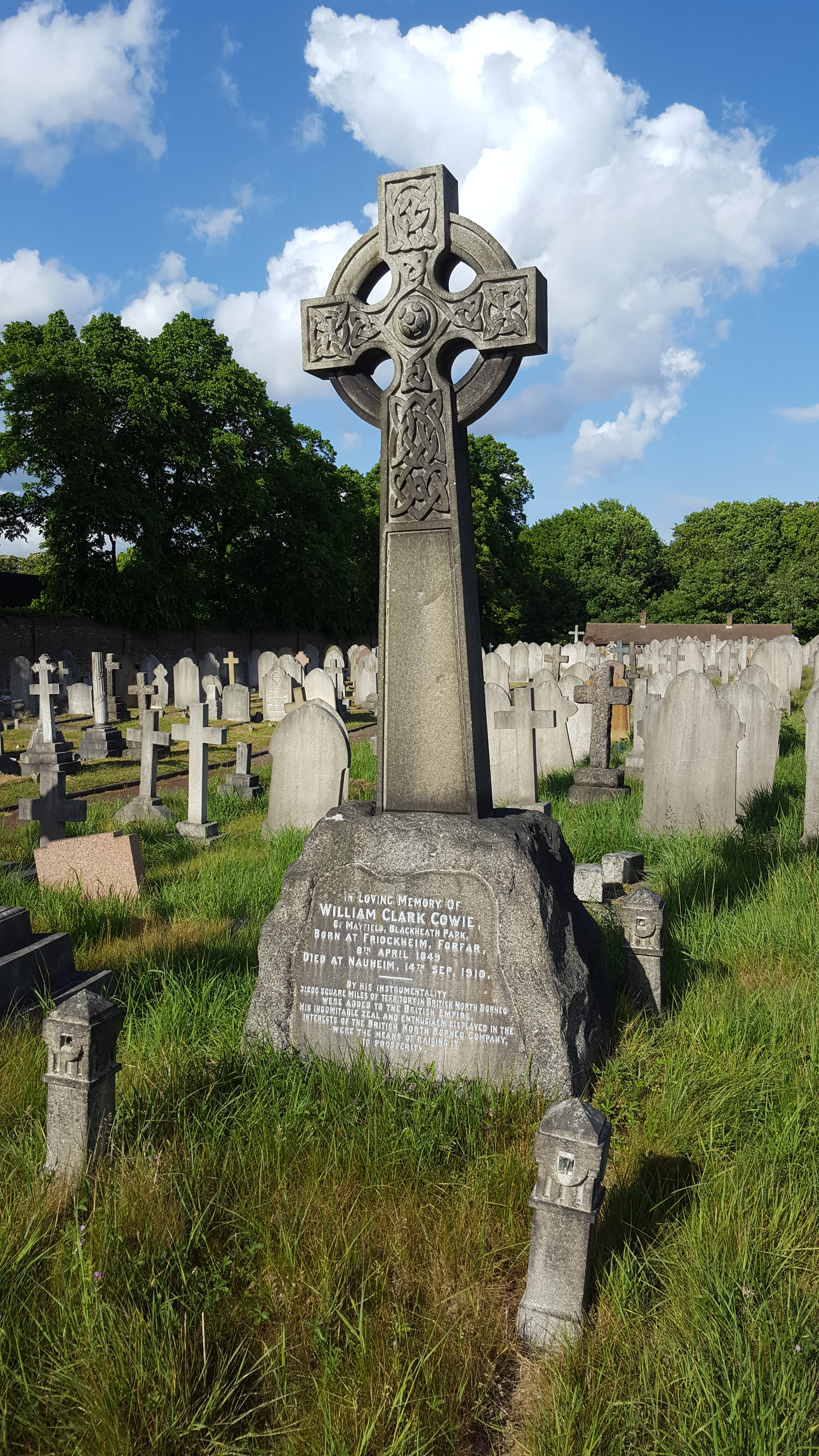
Memorial to William Clark Cowie, in Charlton cemetery.

Toward the end of his life, Cowie suffered from heart disease. In July 1910, he travelled to Germany to undergo surgery. After his condition worsened, Cowie died on 14 September 1910 in Bad Nauheim. His body was returned to England and he was buried on 23 September in Charlton cemetery, near to his home, Mayfield, in Blackheath Park, Blackheath. His gravestone reads:

By his instrumentality 31,000 square miles of territory in British North Borneo were added to the British Empire. His indomitable zeal and enthusiasm displayed in the interests of the British North Borneo Company, were the means of raising it to prosperity.

== Literature ==
- Volker Schult (2008). Wunsch und Wirklichkeit: deutsch-philippinische Beziehungen im Kontext globaler Verflechtungen 1860–1945 (in German). Logos Verlag Berlin GmbH. ISBN 978-3-8325-1898-1.
- K. G. Tregonning (1965). A History of Modern Sabah (North Borneo, 1881–1963). University of Singapore.
