= Alfred Dent =

British businessman (1844–1927)

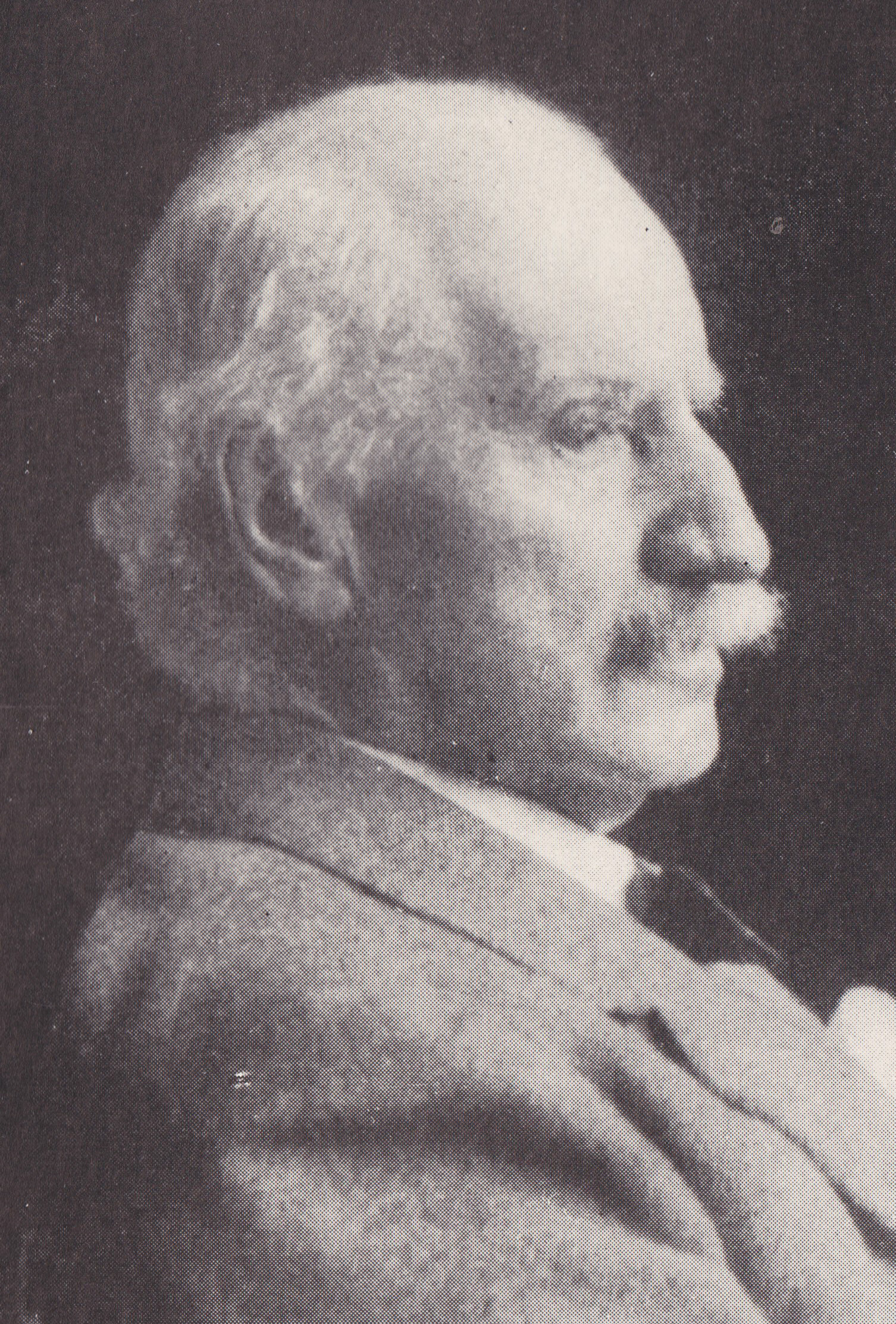
Alfred Dent

Sir Alfred James Dent, KCMG (12 December 1844 – 23 November 1927) was a British colonial merchant and entrepreneur. He was a founder of the British North Borneo Company.

== Life ==
Dent was born in London to Thomas Dent. He was educated at Eton College which he attended from 1858 to 1862, subsequently becoming a partner in the family business of Dent & Co.

=== British North Borneo ===
In the course of business Dent travelled in eastern and south-eastern Asia. In 1878 he induced the Sultan of Sulu to transfer his rights and claims over northern Borneo to a syndicate formed by Dent, his brother Edward Dent, and Gustav Overbeck, the main promoters of which were Sir Rutherford Alcock, Sir Harry Keppel and Richard Biddulph Martin. Subsequently, the British North Borneo Provisional Association was formed in 1881; it obtained a royal charter and in May 1882 became, the British North Borneo Company, also known as the North Borneo Chartered Company.

Dent became head of the firm of Dent Brothers and Co, merchants and commission agents in the City of London. Other business positions held by Dent included chairmanship of the Caledonian (Ceylon) Tea and Rubber Estates and the Shanghai Electric Construction Company and directorships of the Chartered Bank of India, Australia and China, the London County and Westminster Bank and the Royal Exchange Assurance Corporation.

=== Later life ===
In 1896 he married Margaret Aird with whom he had a son, Leslie Alfred Dent, born in 1897. In 1898 Dent was appointed a member of the Indian Currency Commission and, in the same year was made a Knight Commander in the Order of St Michael and St George (KCMG). He had a house at Eastbourne in south-east England, and served as High Sheriff of Sussex in 1908.
