= North Borneo Chartered Company =

British company which administered the protectorate of North Borneo (1881–1946)

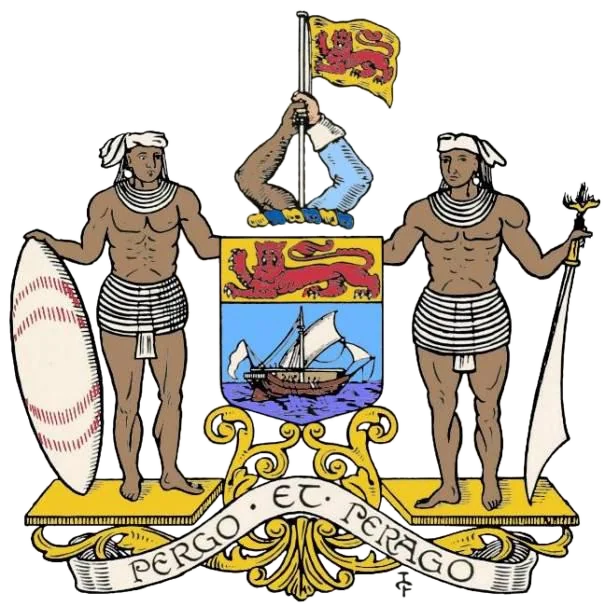
- The Company began using a colour logo in 1930.
- Type: Chartered company
- Industry: Lumber / Opium / Tobacco / Edible bird's nest / Honey / Gold / Natural rubber / Hemp / Coconuts / Copra / Rattan / Beeswax
- Founded: 1 November 1881; 144 years ago
- Founder: Alfred Dent
- Defunct: 26 June 1946
- Headquarters: England, 11 Old Broad Street, Westminster; 1881–1883; 14 Great Queen Street, Westminster; 1883–1891; 15 Leadenhall Street, London; 1891–1900; 7 Threadneedle Street, City of London; 1900–1946; North Borneo, Kudat; 1881–1883; Sandakan; 1884–1942; Jesselton; 1942–1946; Singapore Agents, Guthrie & Co., Boat Quay; Hong Kong Agents, Gibb, Livingston & Co
- Subsidiaries: Territory of North Borneo

The North Borneo Chartered Company (NBCC), also known as the British North Borneo Company (BNBC), was a British chartered company formed on 1 November 1881 to administer and exploit the resources of North Borneo (present-day Sabah in Malaysia). The territory became a protectorate of the British Empire in 1888 but the company remained involved with the territory until 1946, when administration was fully assumed by the Crown colony government.

The company also temporarily administered the island of Labuan in 1890 before it became part of the Straits Settlements. The company motto was Pergo et Perago, which means "I persevere and I achieve" in Latin. Its founder and its first chairman was Alfred Dent.

== History ==
=== Foundation ===
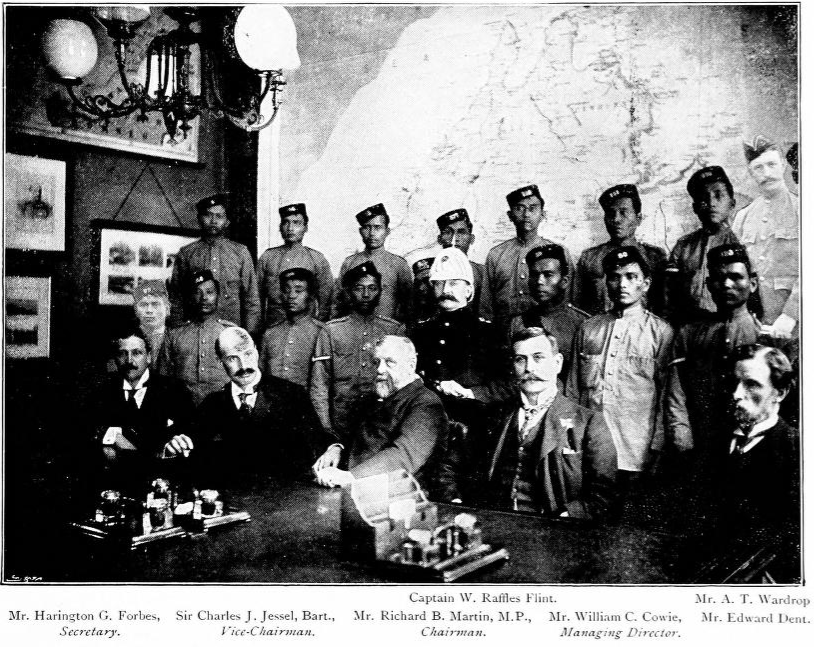
Board of directors of the company, surrounded by the members of the British North Borneo Constabulary.

The company was founded along similar lines as the East India Company. German businessman and diplomat Baron von Overbeck, along with the heads of a British trading company in Shanghai and London, Alfred Dent and Edward Dent, together met with the rulers of northern Borneo to obtain a concession for their colonial interests. The Governor of Labuan, accompanied the negotiations. On 29 December 1877, they met Sultan Abdul Momin of Brunei. The Sultan agreed to make the concession for 15,000 Spanish dollars. However, since it turned out that the Sultan of Brunei had already ceded some areas to the Sultan of Sulu, further negotiations were needed. With the assistance of William Clark Cowie, a Scottish adventurer and friend of Sultan Jamal ul-Azam of Sulu, the Sultan signed a concession treaty on 22 January 1878 and received 5,000 Spanish dollars.

Following the successful concessions, Overbeck and the Dent brothers became the rulers of an area in northern Borneo. Overbeck withdrew in 1879 after failing to attract German interest, leaving Alfred Dent to manage the territory. Dent then planned to register a company to represent the British but since a considerable delay seemed likely, he decided to found a provisional company first. In 1881, the British North Borneo Provisional Association Limited was founded with registered capital of £300,000. The directors were Dent himself together with Rutherford Alcock, Richard Biddulph Martin, Admiral Richard Mayne and William Henry Read. The charter contract for a company with two million pounds of capital was sealed on 1 November 1881.

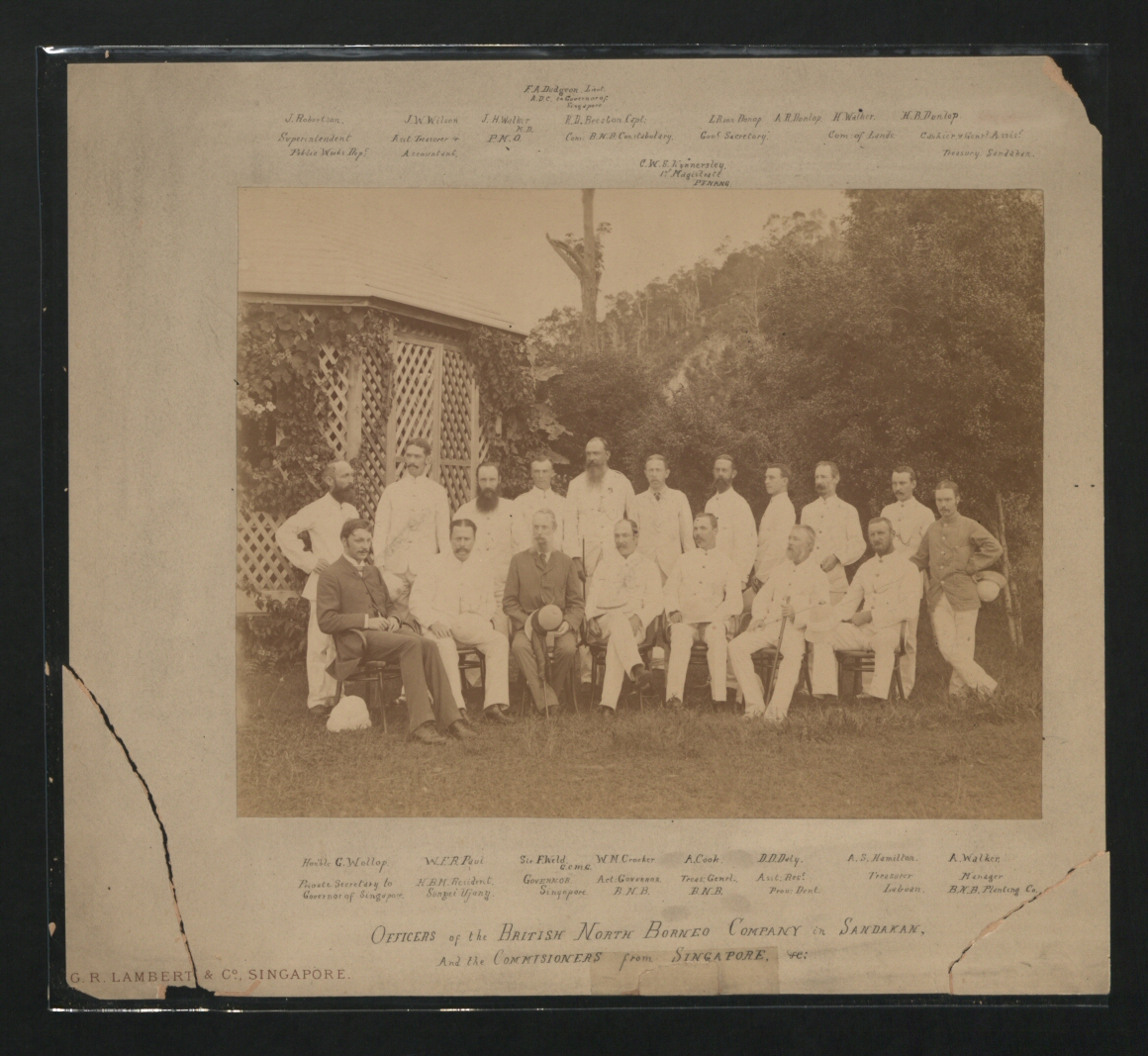
Officers of the company with the commissioners from Singapore during a meeting in Sandakan, c. 1900–1920

The provisional company was dissolved and the following year, a chartered company was established with its first settlement on Gaya Island. The settlement however was burnt down during a raid by a local leader named Mat Salleh and was never re-established. Due to such resistance, establishing law and order as well as recruiting Sikh policemen from northern India became the company's earliest priorities, along with expanding trade; instituting a government, courts, and penal system; building a railway line from Jesselton to Tenom; and encouraging the harvesting and barter trade of local crops, as well as establishment of plantations. The company also faced some resistance to its economic modernisations and tax policies.

=== Dissolution ===
North Borneo was negatively affected by World War II and by the end of the war it was foreseeable that the company would be unable to finance reconstruction. The company therefore waived the further use of their charter and gave North Borneo to the British Colonial Office. The company officially dissolved on 26 June 1946 with the signing of an agreement. From 15 July 1946 until the formation of Malaysia on 16 September 1963, North Borneo was a Crown colony. The agreement with the British government included a £860,000 immediate cash settlement that allowed the company to settle outstanding financial claims. The government's offer to repay all other claims by paying 2.2 million pounds had already been rejected by the company. For the negotiation of further financial compensation, the British government appointed Lord Uthwatt as an independent arbitrator. In March 1949, Uthwatt announced the result of his investigations: £1,400,000 should be awarded to the company as compensation; any claims related to war damage would not be included. The news triggered disappointment among shareholders. Overnight, the value of the company share fell from 17 shillings to 9 shillings and 6d.

== Administration ==
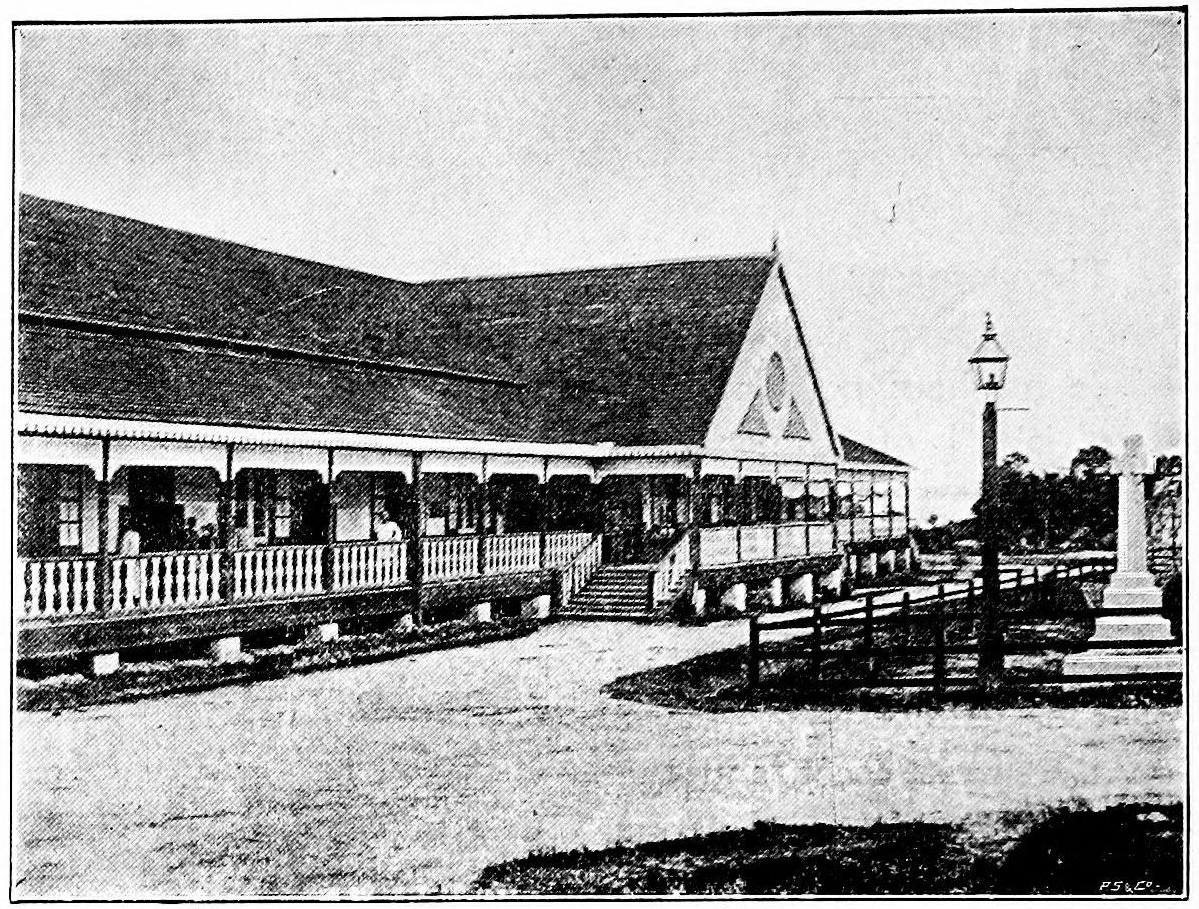
The company administration building in Sandakan

With the founding of the company, the administrative divisions of North Borneo introduced by Overbeck were maintained by the establishment of the West Coast Residency and the East Coast Residency. The seat of the two residents was in Sandakan, where the governor was based. Each residency, in turn, was divided into several provinces managed by a district officer. (Note: The original position was initially Magistrates-in-charge.) Over time, the number of residencies increased to five: Tawau Residency (also known as East Coast Residency), Sandakan Residency, West Coast Residency, Kudat Residency, and Interior Residency. The provinces were initially named after the members of the board: Alcock, Cunlife, Dewhurst, Keppel, Dent, Martin, Elphinstone, Myburgh and Mayne. The senior residents occupied Sandakan and West Coast, while the other three residents with the second class residencies occupied Interior, East Coast and Kudat. The residents of Sandakan and West Coast were members of the Legislative Council, the legislative assembly of the company.

The election of Cowie to the board of directors in 1894 marked the beginning of a major change in the style of administration: Before, North Borneo was governed by the company, and the governors were fully empowered and fully responsible. But since Cowie took over, he mostly ran things from London. Instead of the development of North Borneo, the satisfaction of the shareholders was in the foreground. Alfred Dent, who fiercely opposed Cowie's costly and money-wasting ideas, resigned and withdrew from the company.

Under Neill Malcolm, the administration was ordered to strictly supervise expenditure. Several governors reduced the number of district officers by eliminating the posts in Ranau, Pensiangan, Tenom, Sipitang, Penampang, Tuaran, Langkon, Lamag, Beluran and Semporna. Douglas James Jardine, who become the governor in 1934, completed the process by merging the Tawau Residency with the Sandakan Residency on the one hand and the Interior Residency with the West Coast on the other hand. He also removed the District Officer in Papar.

Municipal administration was governed by the Village Ordinance of 1891. This ordinance fundamentally changed the status of the chiefs, the traditional indigenous tribal leaders. Following its implementation, the company only accepted those chiefs who had appointed them as community leaders. Other chieftains, who had played an important role for generations, were either shut down or branded as criminals or troublemakers. Disrespect for these traditional leaders contributed to the spirit of local resistance led by tribal group such as Mat Salleh and Ontoros Antanum.

=== Tasks ===
The company had two responsibilities, namely:

- Economic development through the exploitation of natural resources of the area. The company was authorised to use the area for agriculture, to settle it, to promote immigration, to mine and to cut wood. An employee of the company and later plantation owner in North Borneo, Owen Rutter, openly named the purpose of "producing dividends".
- Due to the experience of the decline of the British East India Company, a passage was written to protect the rights of the residents. The company was legally responsible for protecting the customs and rights of its residents, but in practice it had to pay dividends, which often limited those rights.

The first governor of North Borneo, William Hood Treacher, devoted himself to the elimination of slavery. However, the land laws issued by him in no way respected the traditional land rights of the inhabitants. The second governor, Charles Vandeleur Creagh, in 1888, issued several proclamations that largely secured foreigners' access to land. A board of directors in London determined the tasks of the company over the governors. Locally, directors over-ruled the governor's instructions. The company established a state power, issued laws (proclamations), recruited Sikh policemen from northern India. Courts were set up to enforce the laws. Furthering the economic exploitation of the area was the construction of a railway line (North Borneo Railway) from Jesselton to Weston and Melalap, the promotion of trade and the establishment of plantations. Effective from 1 March 1883, the periodical North Borneo Herald and Official Gazette was published to disseminate the decisions of the Court of Directors, both within the administrative units of North Borneo, and the company's shareholders and investors.

=== Territory ===
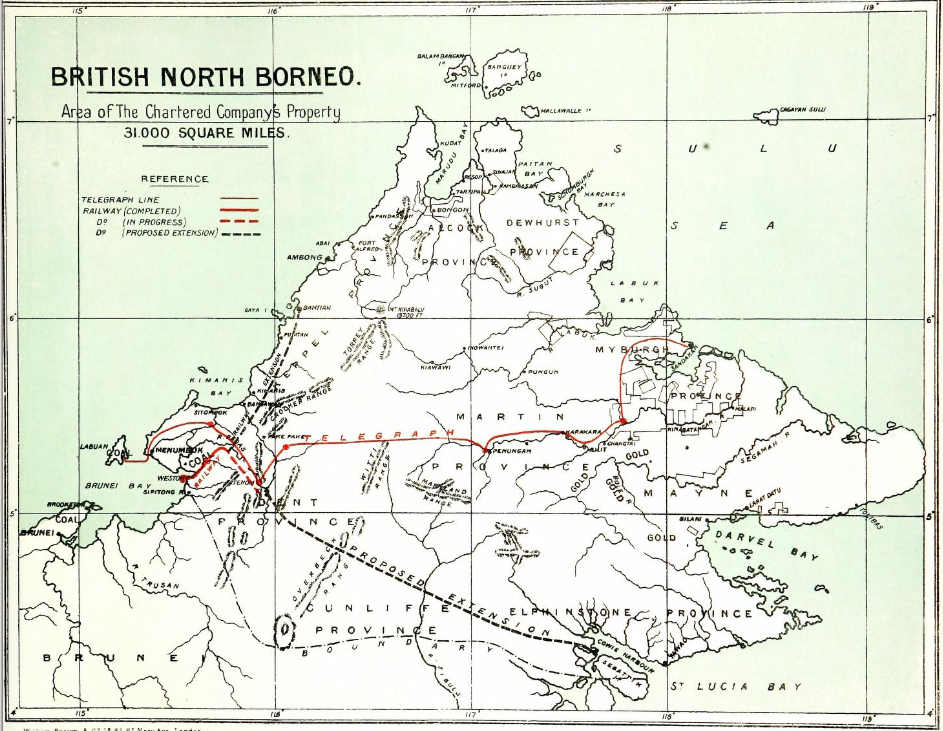
Area acquired by the company

A major contribution to the consolidation of the administrative area was made by William Hood Treacher. In negotiations with the White Rajahs, he managed to bring territories to the company that were not included in the original leases. These include Pengalat (1883), the Klias Peninsula (1884), Mantanani (1885), Padas (1889) and the area of Sipitang, Bongawan to Tuaran (1889). From 1889, the island of Labuan was also part of the company's administrative territory.

British North Borneo provinces in 1888

Although the Netherlands had already installed a trading post in Borneo shortly after the founding of the Dutch East India Company, there were no noteworthy activities by the Dutch on the east coast of northern Borneo. This changed in 1846 when the Dutch signed a contract with the Sultan of Bulungan, who assured the Dutch control of the area. At the instigation of the Dutch, the Sultan married his son with the daughter of the Sultan of Tarakan in 1867, whereby the Dutch sphere of influence reached the region around Tawau. The north of the Dutch area which overlapped with an area that was claimed by the Sultanate of Sulu for themselves. A conflict with the British was therefore inevitable when in 1878 the Sultan of Sulu placed the southern boundary of his land for cession to Overbeck on the Sibuku River. In settling the border disputes, the company negotiated with the Dutch from the 1880s onwards to define the boundary between the area granted by the Sultan of Sulu and the area claimed by the Dutch on the basis of the treaty with the Sultan of Bulungan. On 20 January 1891, they agreed on a line along 4°10' north latitude – which corresponded to a central division of the island of Sebatik. (Note: The final contractual stipulation of this border was not confirmed until 1912 by the Joint Boundary Commission and was parried on 17 February 1913 by Dutch and British negotiators.)

On 5 January 1905, the company territory of Lawas – a controversial border area of the province of Clark was relinquished to the neighbouring Sarawak and in exchange for “certain coal fields at the Brunei Bay”.

=== List of presidents ===
The head of the company was the chairman of the board of directors, since 1910 officially named as President:

Chairman of the British North Borneo Chartered Company
1881–1882	Alfred Dent
1882–1893	Rutherford Alcock
1893–1903	Richard Biddulph Martin
1903–1909	Charles Jessel
1909 – 14 September 1910	William Clark Cowie
Presidents of the British North Borneo Chartered Company
1910–1926	Joseph West Ridgeway
3 February 1926 – 15 July 1946	Neill Malcolm

== See also ==
- Chartered companies
- Governor of North Borneo
- Charter colony, Proprietary colony
