= James Calder (colonial administrator) =

British colonial administrative service officer and judge (1898–1968)

Governor of North Borneo
- In office 1945–1946
- Preceded by: Edward Francis Twining
- Succeeded by: Herbert Ralph Hone

Personal details
- Born: 8 June 1898; Darvel, Ayrshire
- Died: 24 January 1968 (aged 69); Nelson, New Zealand
- Occupation: Colonial administrative service officer and judge

James Calder CMG (8 June 1898 – 24 January 1968) was a British colonial administrative service officer and judge.

== Early life and education ==
Calder was born on 8 June 1898 in Darvel, Ayrshire, Scotland. His father James Calder was a shopkeeper in Glasgow, and a native of New Zealand. Calder was educated at University of Glasgow in 1915, and received his MA in 1921.

Calder served during the First World War in France, Belgium and Germany. In 1916, when he became eligible to enlist, he joined the Argyle and Sutherland Highlanders, and later the Oxford and Buckinghamshire Light Infantry where he was commissioned second lieutenant. In 1918, he served in the Durham Light Infantry until demobilisation in 1919.

== Career ==
He joined the Malayan civil service as a cadet in 1921. He served in a number of posts including Resident of Labuan and Registrar of the Supreme court of Labuan (1923–1926), Collector of Land Revenue, Singapore (1926), District Officer Alor Gajah (1929), magistrate and judge in Penang (1929), Seremban and Kuala Lumpur (1935–36), judge and legal adviser in Terengganu from 1938–39, and Official Administrator, Federated Malay States (1939). During the Second World War, he was evacuated to India and then Australia where he served as the deputy Malayan government agent from 1942–1944. After the war, he served as colonel in the British Military Administration (Malaya) in the post of Senior Civil Affairs Officer. In 1945, he was appointed Governor of North Borneo, was also acting governor on several occasions between 1946 and 1948, and served as Chief Secretary to the government of North Borneo from 1946 to 1952.

== Personal life and death ==
Calder married Emma de Weerdt in 1921. In 1952, he retired to New Zealand, and died in Nelson, New Zealand on 24 January 1968.

== Honours ==
Calder was appointed Companion of the Order of St Michael and Saint George (CMG) in the 1948 New Years Honours.
