= Crown Colony of North Borneo =

British colony in Asia from 1946 to 1963

Crown Colony of North Borneo (1946–1963) State of Sabah (1963)
- 1946–1963
- Flags; Top: (1948–1963); Bottom: Flag (1963) Coat of arms Top: (1948–1963); Bottom: (1963)
- Motto: Pergo et Perago (1948–1963) ("I Persevere and I Achieve") Sabah Maju Jaya (from 1963) ("Let Sabah Prosper")
- Anthem: "God Save the King" (1946–1952); "God Save the Queen" (1952–1963) Sabah Tanah Airku (from 1963) (English: "Sabah, My Homeland")
- Status: British colony
- Capital: Jesselton
- Common languages: English, Kadazan-Dusun, Bajau, Murut, Lundayeh, Rungus, Paitan, Sabah Malay, Chinese etc.
- Monarch
  - 1946–1952: George VI
  - 1952–1963: Elizabeth II
- Governor
  - 1946–1949: Sir Edward Twining
  - 1959–1963: Sir William Goode
- Historical era: post-War • Cold War
  - North Borneo ceded to the Crown Colony: 15 July 1946
  - Administration of the Turtle Islands and Mangsee Islands transferred to the Philippine government: 16 October 1947
  - Self-government: 31 August 1963
  - Malaysia Agreement: 16 September 1963
- Currency: North Borneo dollar, Malaya−British Borneo dollar
Preceded by
British Military Administration (Borneo)
North Borneo
Crown Colony of Labuan
Succeeded by
Malaysia
Sabah
Philippines
Palawan
Sulu
- Today part of: Malaysia; Philippines

The Crown Colony of North Borneo was a Crown colony on the island of Borneo established in 1946 shortly after the dissolution of the British Military Administration. The Crown Colony of Labuan joined the new Crown colony during its formation. It was succeeded as the state of Sabah through the formation of the Federation of Malaysia on 16 September 1963.

== Cession of remaining islands ==
On 16 October 1947, the British transferred administration of the Turtle Islands and the Mangsee Islands to the Philippine government under a treaty signed between the United Kingdom and the United States. The islands now form a part of the Southwestern Tagalog Region (MIMAROPA) and Bangsamoro Autonomous Region in Muslim Mindanao (BARMM).

== Administration ==
Governor of British Crown Colony of North Borneo
- Style: His Excellency
- Appointer: King George VI; Queen Elizabeth II
- Inaugural holder: Sir Edward Twining (1946–1948); Succeeded by Sir Ralph Hone (1949–1954); Sir Roland Turnbull (1954–1959)
- Formation: 1946–1963
- Final holder: Sir William Goode (1960–1963)
- Abolished: 16 September 1963 (formed the Federation of Malaysia)
- Superseded by: Edward Francis Twining

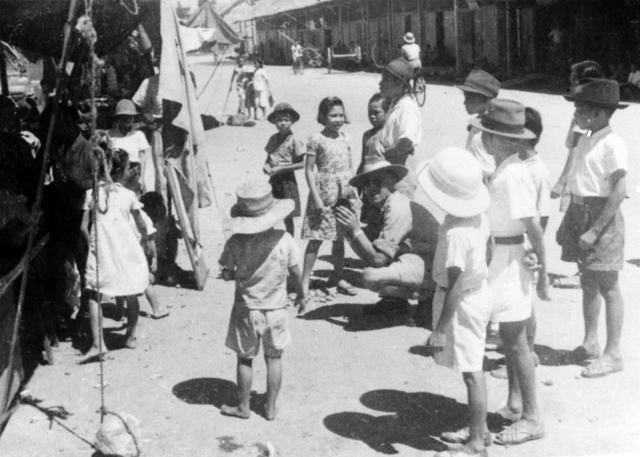
North Borneo children being filmed by an Australian government representative a year after the war in 1946

The Governor of the Crown Colony of North Borneo was appointed by King George VI, and later Queen Elizabeth II. After the formation of Malaysia in 1963 the title was changed to Yang di-Pertua Negara and was subsequently changed to 'Tuan Yang Terutama Yang di-Pertua Negeri Sabah', in 1976 (Enactment. No. 17/1976 Constitution (Amendment)(No. 2)) which means 'His Excellency The Governor of Sabah', or 'His Excellency The Head of State of Sabah' and the appointment was later made by the Yang di-Pertuan Agong (King of Malaysia).

Executive and legislative councils were established in October 1950, replacing the provisional Advisory Council, which had existed since July 1946. The Executive Council, which advised the governor on matters of policy, consisted of three ex officio members (the Chief Secretary, Financial Secretary, and Attorney-General), two appointed official members, and four appointed unofficial members. The Legislative Council consisted of the Governor as president, the three ex officio members, nine appointed official members, and ten appointed unofficial members. The governor customarily appointed unofficial members from lists of names put forward by a representative body. The development of democratic institutions was much slower in North Borneo than it was in neighbouring Sarawak.

For local administration, the colony was divided into four residencies overseen by a resident, which were subdivided into districts overseen by district officers. The district officer for the island of Labuan reported directly to the Chief Secretary. The districts were subdivided into sub-districts overseen by assistant district officers. Most district officers were expatriates, while the majority of assistant district officers were locally recruited.

The North Borneo Police Force served as the colony's police force, and prior to 1 January 1950, was known as the North Borneo Armed Constabulary.

Within each district, village headmen were responsible for minor administrative tasks. Headmen reported to chiefs, who in turn reported to the district officer. The chiefs presided over native courts, which dealt with breaches of native custom and Islamic law. District officers could also act in a magisterial capacity and had jurisdiction over civil actions, breaches of the laws of the colony, and offences against the penal code.

In 1951, the Rural Development Ordinance provided for the establishment of local authorities in rural areas. The first such authority was set up in Kota Belud District on 1 January 1952 under the direction of the district and assistant district officers. Members of the local authority were entirely appointed, representing both the native population and the Chinese population of Kota Belud. This pattern was repeated throughout the territory as other rural authorities were established.

An ordinance regarding urban government came into force on 1 July 1954, which allowed for the creation of township authorities, town boards, and municipal councils. Jesselton and Sandakan became town board areas, as did Tawau and Labuan in 1955. Members of local councils were entirely appointed by the governor, though unofficial members were required to be in the majority.

== Public transportation ==
=== Bus services ===
It was not until mid-1953, with the passage of a Road Traffic Ordinance, that public transport bus service companies in North Borneo were established, after a sufficiently-worthy network of roads had been constructed. This ordinance specifically authorized the Commissioner of Road Transport "the authority to regulate passenger and goods service vehicles in any area declared by the Governor-in-Council to be a regulated area."

Jesselton and Sandakan were the first towns deemed in 1953 to be "regulated areas," and monopoly licenses were granted on the main routes. Immediately, 503 transit and transport companies were established in the colony, but by the end of the year, that number had been reduced to 206. Within a decade, passengers were able to ride from one side of the country to the other solely on transit bus through connecting services.

In Jesselton, the main transit companies that survived beyond British rule were the Luen Thung Transit Company (LTTC), the Penampang Union Transport Company (PUTCO), and the Tuaran Union Transport Company (TUTCO).
