= Douglas James Jardine =

British colonial administrator (1888-1946)

Sir Douglas James Jardine KCMG OBE (13 October 1888 – 11 December 1946) was a British colonial administrator, holding the posts of Governor of North Borneo, Sierra Leone and the Leeward Islands during his career.

== Biography ==
Douglas was educated at Westminster School and at Trinity College, Cambridge, taking his BA Hons. in Classics in 1919. Immediately after graduating, he joined the colonial service and was posted as assistant secretary to the government of Cyprus from 1910–16.

In 1916, he became Secretary to Administration in British Somaliland, a position he held until 1921. During this posting, he accompanied the British Mission to the Coronation of Empress Zauditu of Abyssinia in 1917 and has been awarded the OBE in 1918. In 1920, he was appointed Officer in Charge H.Q. Services, Somaliland Expeditionary Force.

Three years later, he published The Mad Mullah of Somaliland, his book on Diiriye Guure's rebel leader-emir Mohammed Abdullah Hassan, the so-called "Mad Mullah" who led an armed resistance against British, Italian, and Ethiopian forces in Somalia.

In 1921, Douglas became Senior Assistant Secretary, Nigerian Secretariat, a post he held until 1927.

In 1927, he was posted to Tanganyika Territory, beginning an eight-year association with the country. He was Deputy Chief Secretary, Tanganyika from 1927–28; Chief Secretary to Government, Tanganyika, 1928–34; and acting Governor, Tanganyika, in 1929, 1931, 1933 and 1934.

In 1929, 1930 and 1931, Douglas was also the accredited representative of H.M. Government to the Permanent Mandates Commission at Geneva. He was appointed CMG in 1932. In 1934, he was appointed Governor and Commander-in-Chief, North Borneo, a post he held until 1937.

Later that year he was appointed Governor of Sierra Leone (1937–41). As Governor of Sierra Leone he took care to improve relations with the native population. Nineteen British missionaries were asked to leave South Africa by the administration of Prime Minister J. B. M. Hertzog on the grounds that the missionaries were "subversive" for encouraging native Africans to take part in political activities. All nineteen of the missionaries had what the South African government declared "a pro-African bias" and were "native sympathizers." Jardine personally wrote and asked all of these missionaries to work in Sierra Leone. Seventeen out of the nineteen did so, taking up work in the southern portion of the country around Bonthe and the area around Pujehun. These missionaries were not interested in proselytizing, but rather worked to distribute mepacrine and quinine to combat malaria as well as penicillin and streptomycin to treat bacterial infections.

== Honours ==
In 1941, he was appointed as Governor of the Leeward Islands from 1941–43. He was appointed KCMG in 1938.

Douglas died in December 1946.

== Publications ==
- The Handbook of Cyprus 1913 and 1919.
- The Mad Mullah of Somaliland 1923.
- Memorandum on indirect rule and the system of administration of the natives of North Borneo 1935.
- If I were you (drama) Published 1979

== Notes ==
Government offices
| Preceded by Arthur Frederick Richards | Governor of North Borneo; 1934–1937 | Succeeded by Charles Robert Smith |
| Preceded by Sir Henry Monck-Mason Moore | Governor of Sierra Leone; 1937–1941 | Succeeded by Sir Hubert Craddock Stevenson |
| Preceded by Sir Gordon James Lethem | Governor of the Leeward Islands; 1941–1937 | Succeeded by Sir Brian Freeston |
