= Governor Humphreys =

Governor Humphreys may refer to:

- Benjamin G. Humphreys (1808–1882), 26th Governor of Mississippi
- John Lisseter Humphreys (1881–1929), Governor of North Borneo from 1926 to 1929

== See also ==
- Lyman U. Humphrey (1844–1915), 11th Governor of Kansas
