= Governor Turnbull =

Governor Turnbull may refer to:

- Richard Turnbull (colonial governor) (1909–1998), Governor of Tanganyika from 1958 to 1961
- Roland Evelyn Turnbull (1905–1960), Governor of North Borneo from 1954 to 1959
