= Aylmer Cavendish Pearson =

British colonial administrative service officer (1876-1926)

Aylmer Cavendish Pearson CMG
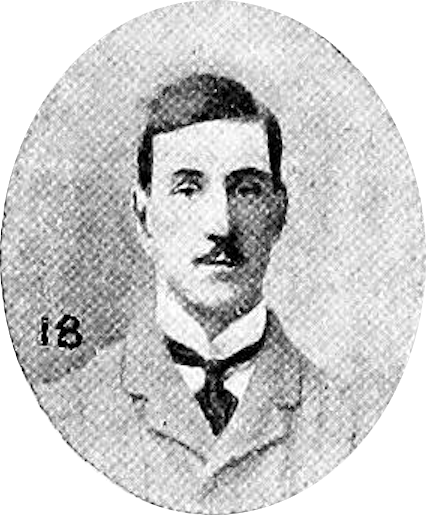
- Pearson in 1899

Governor of North Borneo
- In office 1915–1922
- Preceded by: Cecil William Chase Parr
- Succeeded by: William Henry Rycroft

Governor of North Borneo
- In office 1925–1926
- Preceded by: William Henry Rycroft
- Succeeded by: John Lisseter Humphreys

Personal details
- Born: 5 August 1876
- Died: 15 March 1926 (aged 49) Jesselton, North Borneo (present-day Kota Kinabalu, Sabah, Malaysia)
- Children: 1 daughter
- Education: Trinity College, Dublin
- Occupation: Colonial administrative service officer

Aylmer Cavendish Pearson CMG (5 August 1876 – 15 March 1926) was a British colonial administrative officer who served as Governor of North Borneo from 1915–1922 and from 1925–26.

== Early life and education ==
Pearson was born on 5 August 1876, the son of Colonel Hugh Pearson. He was educated at Felsted School, and at Trinity College, Dublin.

== Career ==
Pearson joined the British North Borneo Service in 1897 as a cadet. He served in various posts including assistant Treasurer (1899); Resident, Kudat (1901); Secretary to the Government (1904); sessions judge (1905); member of the Executive Council (1906); acting Judicial Commissioner and acting Commissioner of Lands (1908); Secretary to the Government and judge of the High Court of North Borneo (1909).

In 1910 and 1911, he was appointed acting Governor of North Borneo. He served two terms as Governor of North Borneo; from 1915 to 1922, and from 1925 to 1926.

== Personal life and death ==
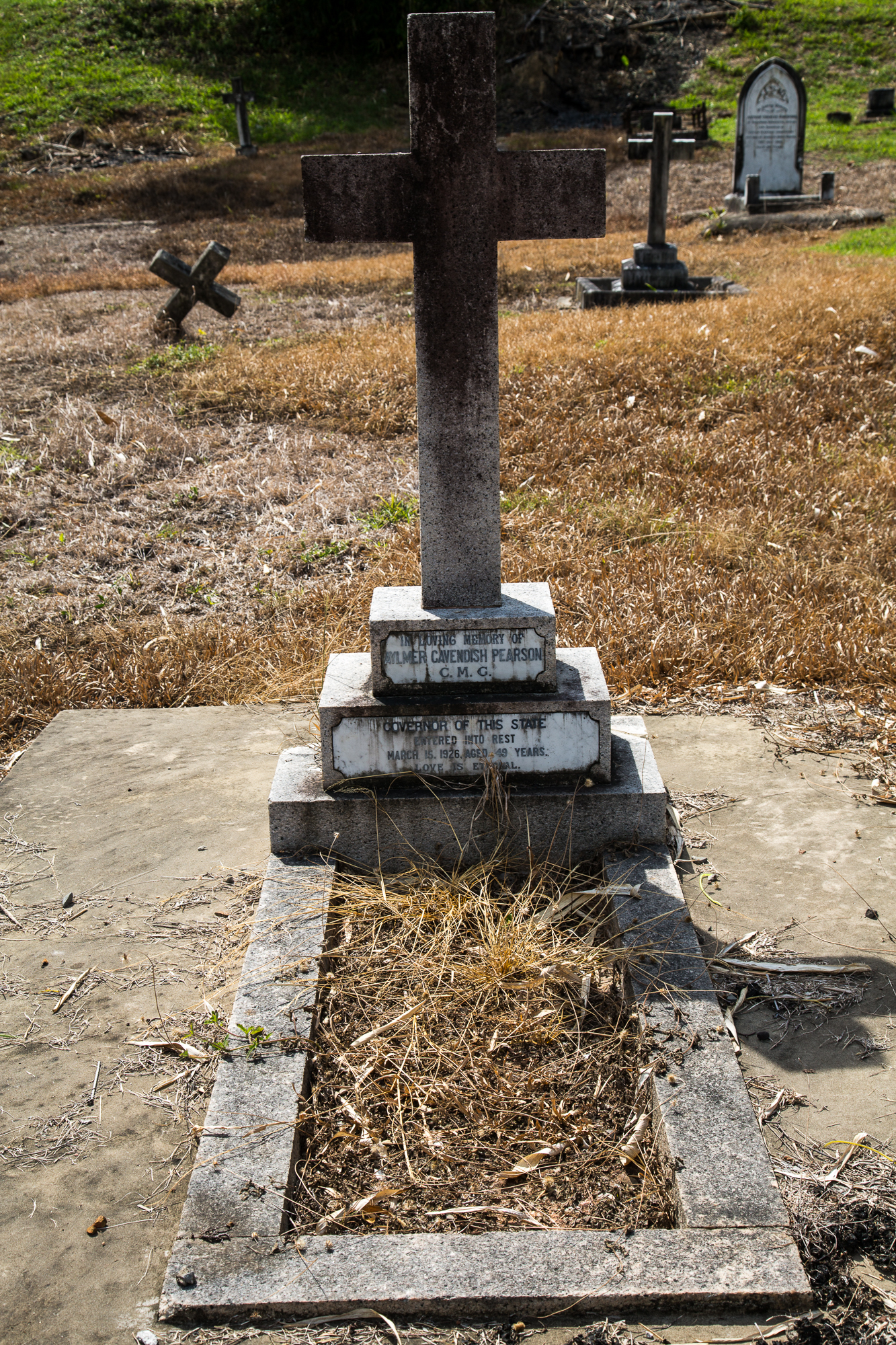
Grave in Kota Kinabalu (Anglican Cemetery)

Pearson married Violet, daughter of Edward Gueritz in 1907 and they had a daughter. He died on 15 March 1926 in Jesselton, North Borneo (present-day Kota Kinabalu, Sabah, Malaysia), aged 49.

== Honours ==
Pearson was appointed Companion of the Order of St Michael and St George (CMG) in the 1919 New Years Honours.
