= Governor Hone =

Governor Hone may refer to:

- Evelyn Dennison Hone (1911–1979), Governor of Northern Rhodesia from 1959 to 1964
- Ralph Hone (1896–1992), Governor of North Borneo from 1950 to 1954
