= William Rycroft =

British Army general and colonial governor (1861–1925)

Major-General Sir William Rycroft KCB KCMG
- Born: William Henry Rycroft; 17 February 1861
- Died: 4 November 1925 (aged 64); Rosebank, Perthshire, Scotland
- Burial place: All Saints Church, Dummer, Hampshire, England
- Alma mater: Royal Military College, Sandhurst
- Spouse: Grace Menzies (m. 1887)
- Children: 2
- Military career
- Allegiance: United Kingdom
- Branch: British Army
- Service years: 1871–1922
- Rank: Major-General

Major-General Sir William Henry Rycroft KCB KCMG (17 February 1861 – 4 November 1925) was a British Army officer who rose to the rank of major general, and colonial governor of British North Borneo.

== Early military career ==
Rycroft was the second of six children of Sir Nelson Rycroft, 4th Baronet, and his wife Juliana Ogilvy. His elder brother Richard became the 5th baronet.

Rycroft was educated at Eton College and the Royal Military College, Sandhurst, and in August 1879 he was commissioned as a second lieutenant into the 107th Regiment of Foot (later the Royal Sussex Regiment) before transferring to the 71st (Highland) Regiment of Foot which became part of the Highland Light Infantry (HLI) in 1881.

He took part in the Gordon Relief Expedition in 1884–85. He transferred as a captain to the 7th Dragoon Guards in April 1888, attended the Staff College, Camberley, 1891–1892, was deputy assistant adjutant general at York 1895–1896, served on the North-West Frontier in India 1897–1898 and served on the staff during the South African War 1899–1900. While serving at York he was transferred to the 11th Hussars as a major in August 1896, and from November 1900 he was 2nd in command of that regiment.

Rycroft was appointed in command of the 3rd Provincial Regiment of Dragoons, with the temporary rank of lieutenant-colonel, from 14 September 1902; but in December that year was attached to the Dervish War campaign, where he served as a base commandant, also with the temporary rank of lieutenant colonel. He was appointed regimental commander of the 11th Hussars with the substantive rank of lieutenant colonel on 29 September 1904, serving as such until 1908, during which he received the brevet rank of colonel in September 1907. In July 1909, while serving on the half-pay list, he was promoted to full colonel.

He was in South Africa again from 1911 to 1912 and he succeeded Brigadier General George Forestier-Walker as assistant quartermaster general in Southern Command from October 1912 to 1914.

== First World War ==
He fought in the First World War, which began in the summer of 1914, and was mentioned in dispatches seven times for his service throughout the conflict. After serving as an assistant quartermaster general from 20 August, he was promoted to the temporary rank of brigadier general and succeeded William Hickie as deputy adjutant and quartermaster general (DAAG) of II Corps of the British Expeditionary Force on 30 September.

Promoted to the substantive rank of major general in June 1915 "for distinguished service in the Field", he was then made general officer commanding (GOC) of the 32nd Division. He commanded the division, a Kitchener's Army formation composed largely of Pals battalions from over the British Isles, from late June 1915 onwards. He led the division on the Western Front later in the year and saw particularly fierce fighting during the Battle of the Somme in July 1916, including on the first day on the Somme on 1 July.

On 1 August 1917 he succeeded Major General Travers Clarke as DQMG of the British Salonika Army.

He was major general of administration in the Army of the Black Sea 1918–20, then major general in command of administration with Irish Command from June 1920, when he took over from Major General Felix Ready, until 1921.

== Post-war and final years ==
A year later he retired from the army and served as governor of North Borneo from 1922 until his death in November 1925, at the age of 64. After his death, his predecessor Aylmer Cavendish Pearson took over the governorship for the second time.

== Honours ==
Rycroft was appointed CB in the 1910 Birthday Honours, CMG "in recognition of meritorious services during the war" in 1915, and knighted KCMG "for services rendered in connection with Military Operations in the Field" in the 1918 New Year Honours. After the war he was awarded the additional knighthood of KCB "for valuable services rendered in connection with Military Operations in the Balkans" in the 1919 Birthday Honours; made Grand Commander of the Greek Order of the Redeemer and awarded the Greek Medal of Military Merit; awarded the Serbian Order of the White Eagle, 2nd Class (with Swords); made commandeur of the French Legion of Honour; and made a Grand Officer of the Order of the Star of Roumania. He was a Knight of Grace of the Order of the Hospital of St John of JerusaJem.

== Bibliography ==
- Simkins, Peter (2014). From the Somme to Victory: The British Army's Experience on the Western Front 1916-1918. Pen and Sword Books. ISBN 978-1781593127.

Government offices
Preceded by Aylmer Cavendish Pearson (1st term)	Governor of North Borneo; 1922–1925	Succeeded by Aylmer Cavendish Pearson (2nd term)
