= Hubert Stevenson =

British colonial administrator (1888–1971)

Sir Hubert Stevenson KCMG OBE MC
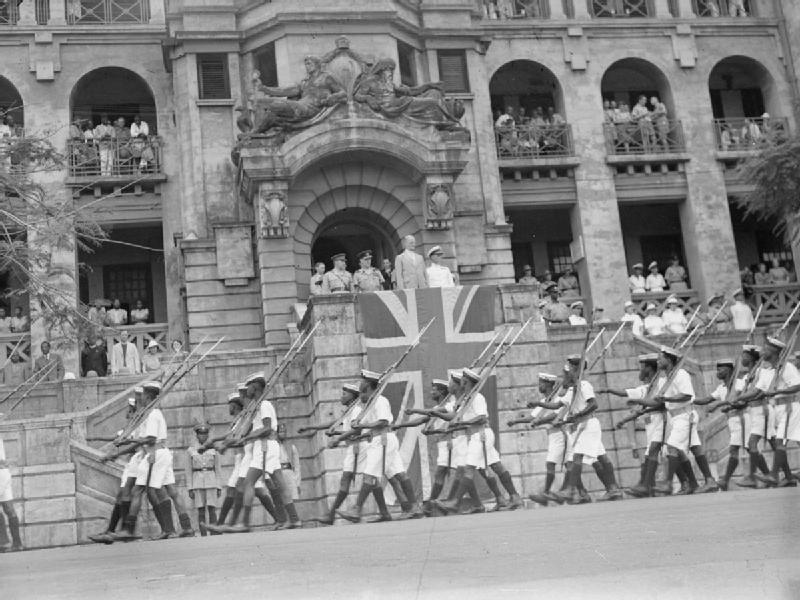
- African Naval ratings march past His Excellency the Governor of Sierra Leone, Major Sir Hubert Stevenson, KCMG, OBE, MC who received the salute on the balcony of the Law Courts, Freetown, Sierra Leone

Governor of Sierra Leone
- In office 1941–1947
- Preceded by: Sir Douglas Jardine
- Succeeded by: Sir George Beresford-Stooke

Sir Hubert Craddock Stevenson, KCMG, OBE, MC (1888 – 13 June 1971) was a British colonial administrator. He was Governor of Sierra Leone from 1941 to 1947.

The second son of Henry Thomas Stevenson, Hubert Stevenson was educated at Harrow School. During the First World War, he served with the Royal Field Artillery from 1915 to 1919. He was appointed to the Nigerian Administrative Service in 1920.

As governor, Stevenson was "particularly keen on restoring harmony between the Chiefs and their educated competitors; but unlike his predecessors, his inclination was toward a balance which tilted somewhat in favor of the latter."
