= Roland Turnbull =

British governor of North Borneo from 1954 to 1959

Sir Roland Turnbull KCMG
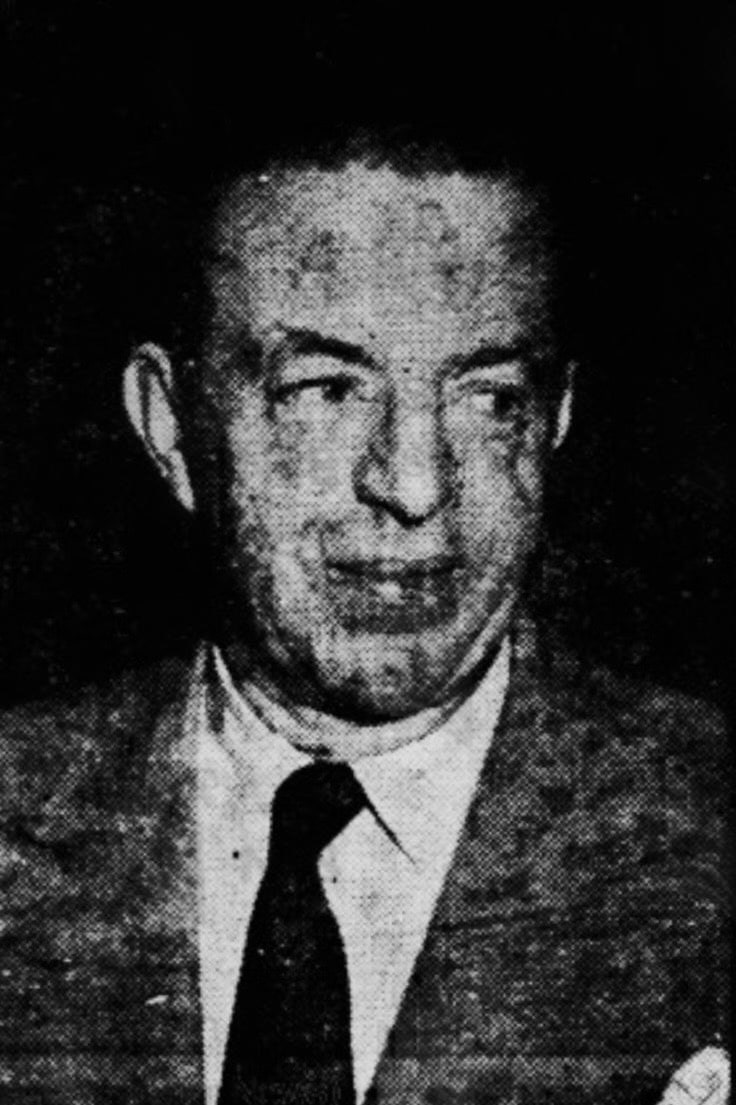
- Turnbull in 1954

22nd Governor of North Borneo
- In office 4 March 1954 – 1959
- Monarch: Elizabeth II
- Preceded by: Ralph Hone
- Succeeded by: William Goode

12th British Resident to Brunei
- In office 1934–1937
- Monarchs: George V Edward VIII; George VI
- Preceded by: Thomas Carey
- Succeeded by: John Black

Personal details
- Born: 9 June 1905
- Died: 23 December 1960 (aged 55)
- Spouse: Sylvia Burbidge (m. 1948)
- Education: King's College London; St John's College
- Occupation: Colonial administrator

Sir Roland Evelyn Turnbull (9 June 1905 – 23 December 1960) was a British colonial administrator who served as the British Resident to Brunei from 1934 to 1937 and governor of British North Borneo from 1954 to 1959.

As British Resident in Brunei from 1934 to 1937, Turnbull where he mentored the future Sultan Omar Ali Saifuddien III and encouraged his early involvement in government. He also proposed plans for agricultural and economic development, though these were limited by budget constraints. As colonial secretary and acting governor in Cyprus between 1945 and 1950, Turnbull managed political tensions during a sensitive period, particularly regarding the movement for union with Greece, which he believed lacked popular support.

From 1954 to 1959, Turnbull served as governor of North Borneo. He advocated for Brunei's autonomy, opposed efforts to merge the Bornean territories under a single authority, and negotiated Filipino immigration to address labour shortages. He also developed strong ties with emerging local leaders like Fuad Stephens. Turnbull was known for his close relationship with local rulers and his understanding of regional politics. His cautious approach helped navigate complex political transitions in Southeast Asia.

== Early life and education ==
Turnbull, born on 9 June 1905, was the son of George Turnbull of Berwick-upon-Tweed. He was educated at King's College London and later at St John's College, Oxford.

== Career ==
=== Early years in Malaya ===
Turnbull joined the British Colonial Service as a cadet in 1929 and was first posted to the District Office, Tampin, Malaya. In 1931, he was commissioned Terengganu Collector of Land Revenue. On the same year, when serving as second magistrate in Kuala Lumpur, he successfully underwent an appendicitis operation on 9 August at the Bungsar Hospital, as reported by the Malay Mail. His recovery delayed his intended departure for Terengganu to take up his new appointment as Settlement Collector. In 1933, he was appointed assistant secretary to the High Commissioner for Malaya, Cecil Clementi.

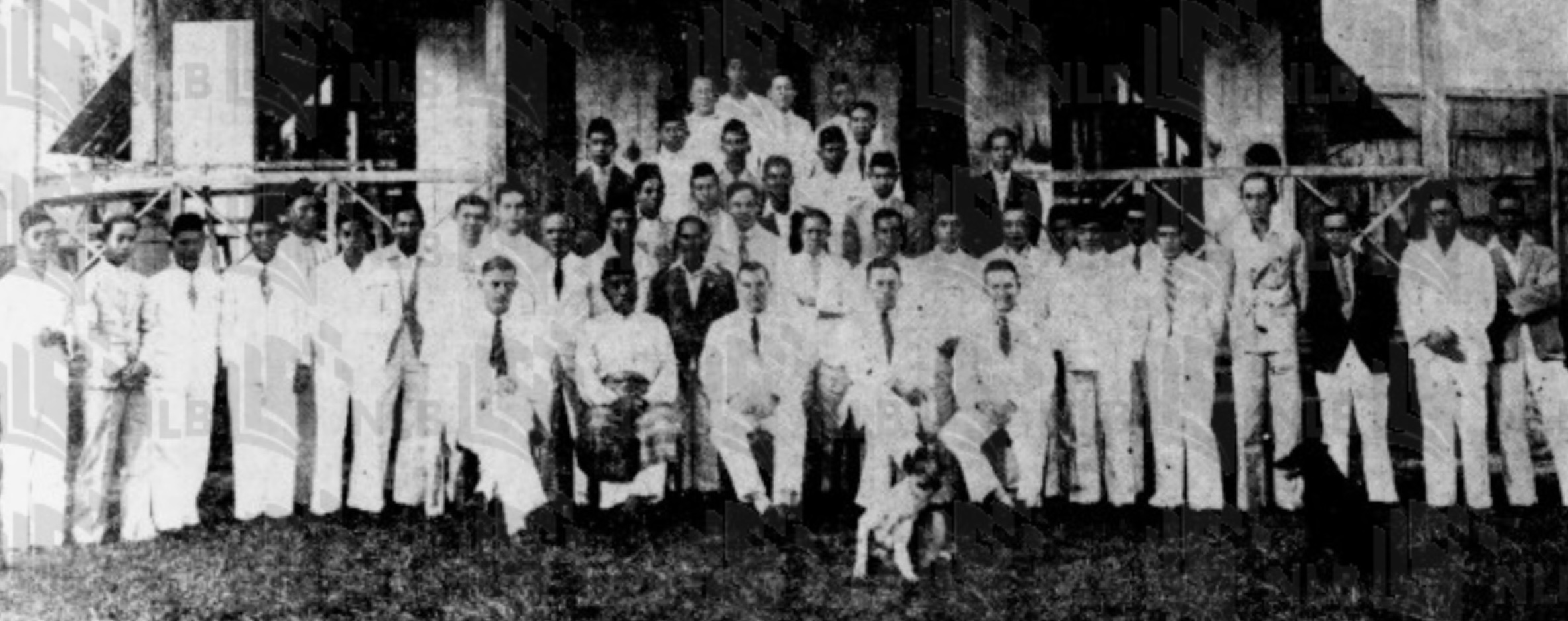
Turnbull (seated second from the right) at the Belait Recreation Club in 1935

=== British Resident in Brunei ===
In 1934, Turnbull was appointed British Resident in Brunei. He developed a clear fondness for the young Prince Omar Ali Saifuddien, then known as Pengiran Muda Tengah, a sentiment he later expressed in his correspondence. Turnbull observed that Sultan Ahmad Tajuddin harboured jealousy towards his younger brother, a dynamic that likely influenced court politics at the time. This close personal connection with the young prince shaped Turnbull's later views and decisions regarding Brunei, particularly his strong support for the Sultan during key political transitions.

Following the prince's return from his studies in Malaya in 1936, Turnbull encouraged him to join the state administrative service. He facilitated his entry into government by securing his first post as a cadet in the Forestry Department, based in Kuala Belait. This early opportunity, arranged by Turnbull, marked the beginning of the prince's exposure to rural life and administrative duties, experiences that would significantly influence his future role as Sultan.

Drawing on his time in Brunei, Turnbull claimed a deep understanding of Sultan Omar Ali Saifuddien III, whom he had known intimately since his youth. He even asserted that he had advised the young prince on how to deal with his brother, Ahmad Tajuddin, and later boasted that the Sultan came to regard him as a father figure.

Turnbull adopted a highly cautious approach to public spending, even as oil revenues began to rise. He approved only minimal expenditure required to maintain a basic administrative structure and resisted funding for public services like health and education, which he deemed financially unremunerative. Turnbull prioritised revenue-generating departments, arguing that Brunei's oil reserves were finite and that income from oil should be carefully preserved. Apart from this conservatism, he did, however, submit a draft scheme for agricultural development in 1935, through its limited scope. His conservative financial strategy was part of a broader propensity towards underdevelopment in pre-war Brunei, bolstered by endemic manpower shortages and the narrow educational base of the population.

=== Colonial Office ===
Turnbull was seconded to the Colonial Office in 1937 and served in the Colonial Secretariat from 1937 to 1940. During this period, he continued to sit at the Fourth Police Court until 3 October 1939, when he was transferred to the office of the Financial Secretary at the Treasury. He was succeeded in his role as magistrate by Kenneth Michael Byrne. Later that year, Turnbull was appointed Controller of Foreign Exchange, and this appointment took formal effect on 1 April 1940, as confirmed by the Officer Administering the Government.

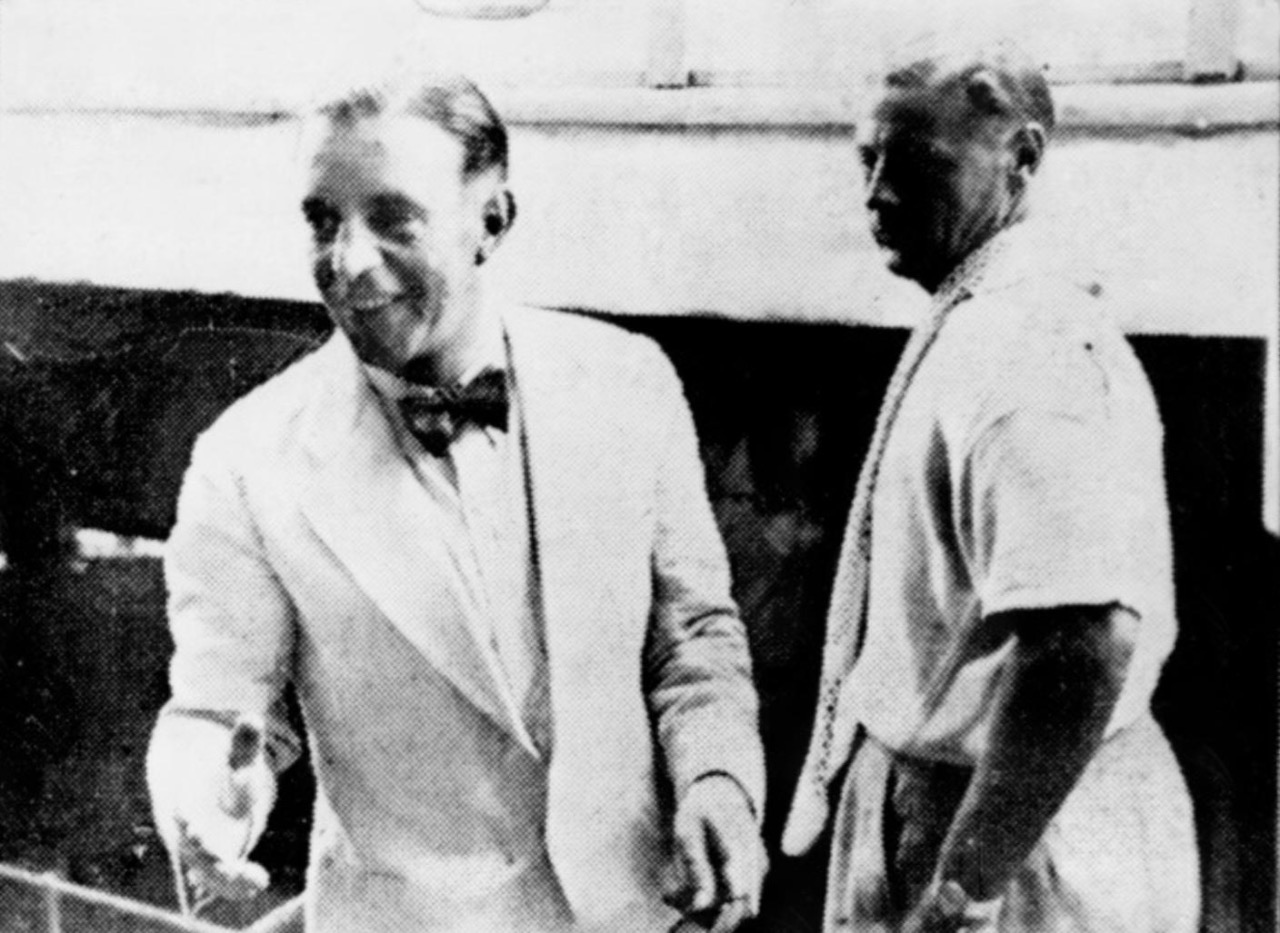
Turnbull (left) at Clifford Pier in 1940

=== British Honduras ===
According to British Official Wireless, Turnbull, then an Officer of the Colonial Administrative Service, Class V of the Malayan Civil Service, was selected to become Colonial Secretary of British Honduras, replacing W. Johnston in April 1940. After eleven years of service in the Malayan Civil Service, he left Singapore in late April to assume his new position. At thirty-five, Turnbull became one of the youngest individuals to hold the post of colonial secretary.

=== Administrative branch and Cyprus ===
From 1943 to 1945, Turnbull served in the War Office as a temporary colonel in the Colonial Administrative branch. In 1945, he was appointed Colonial Secretary of Cyprus, where he also acted as governor and commander-in-chief on several occasions between 1945 and 1947.

Turnbull served as Colonial Secretary in Cyprus until 1950, during which time he also held the position of acting governor both before and after the tenure of Reginald Fletcher. Like Fletcher and several other British officials of the period, Turnbull believed that enosis, the movement advocating union with Greece, was neither genuine nor widely supported among the Greek Cypriot population. He considered the movement inauthentic and lacking in broad popular backing, a belief that influenced his approach to Cypriot political affairs throughout his tenure.

=== Africa ===
Following his service in Cyprus, Turnbull was appointed Deputy High Commissioner for Basutoland, Bechuanaland, and Swaziland, holding the title of Chief Secretary from 1950 to 1953. He was succeeded in this role by Thomas Scrivenor in November 1953.

=== Governor of North Borneo ===
==== Integration question with Federation of Malaya ====
He was later named governor designate of British North Borneo and was scheduled to arrive in Singapore aboard the RMS Carthage on 2 March 1954. He was formally installed as the third postwar governor of North Borneo on 4 March 1954 in Jesselton, succeeding B. J. O'Brien, who had been serving as chief secretary and acting governor since the retirement of Ralph Hone in December the previous year.

On 23 May 1954, Turnbull officiated the opening of the Hongkong and Shanghai Banking Corporation's new four storey building in Jesselton, valued at S$1,500,00 dollars. The event drew a crowd of approximately 700 people. Later that year in October, at the British Governors' Conference held in Kuching, Turnbull firmly argued that any move toward closer association between the Bornean territories and Malaya must involve the creation of a single government that eliminated the individual geographical identities of North Borneo, Sarawak, and Brunei. His position reflected a clear preference for deeper administrative integration across Borneo as a necessary precondition for any future political union with Singapore and the Federation of Malaya. This view stood in sharp contrast to others expressed at the conference, particularly regarding Brunei's autonomy and its control over oil revenue.

==== Labour issues in North Borneo ====
Turnbull on 12 November 1954 stated that the government was taking active steps to induce Filipino immigration to assist in alleviating North Borneo's grave deficiency of labour. The Philippine government had committed the idea in principle, he continued, and a Filipino team of surveyors would soon be coming out to visit working and living conditions here. In an earlier release, in September, Turnbull had spoken of negotiating to bring huge numbers of workers and declared his optimism that North Borneo could support in the future many millions compared to its present population of perhaps 340,000. A previous effort in 1952 to bring Indian labourers had failed, so this new proposal was that much more crucial.

==== Tensions with Sarawak, appointment of Chief Minister of Brunei ====
As with Anthony Abell, Governor of Saravak, Turnbull supported the administrative separation of Brunei from Sarawak but held that Brunei ought to have an independent and full-fledged high commissioner, rather than a British Resident who would owe allegiance to a High Commissioner who could be based elsewhere. Turnbull's influence extended to shaping Colonial Office perspectives, and he may have actively turned Omar Ali Saifuddien against Abell by questioning Abell's intentions.

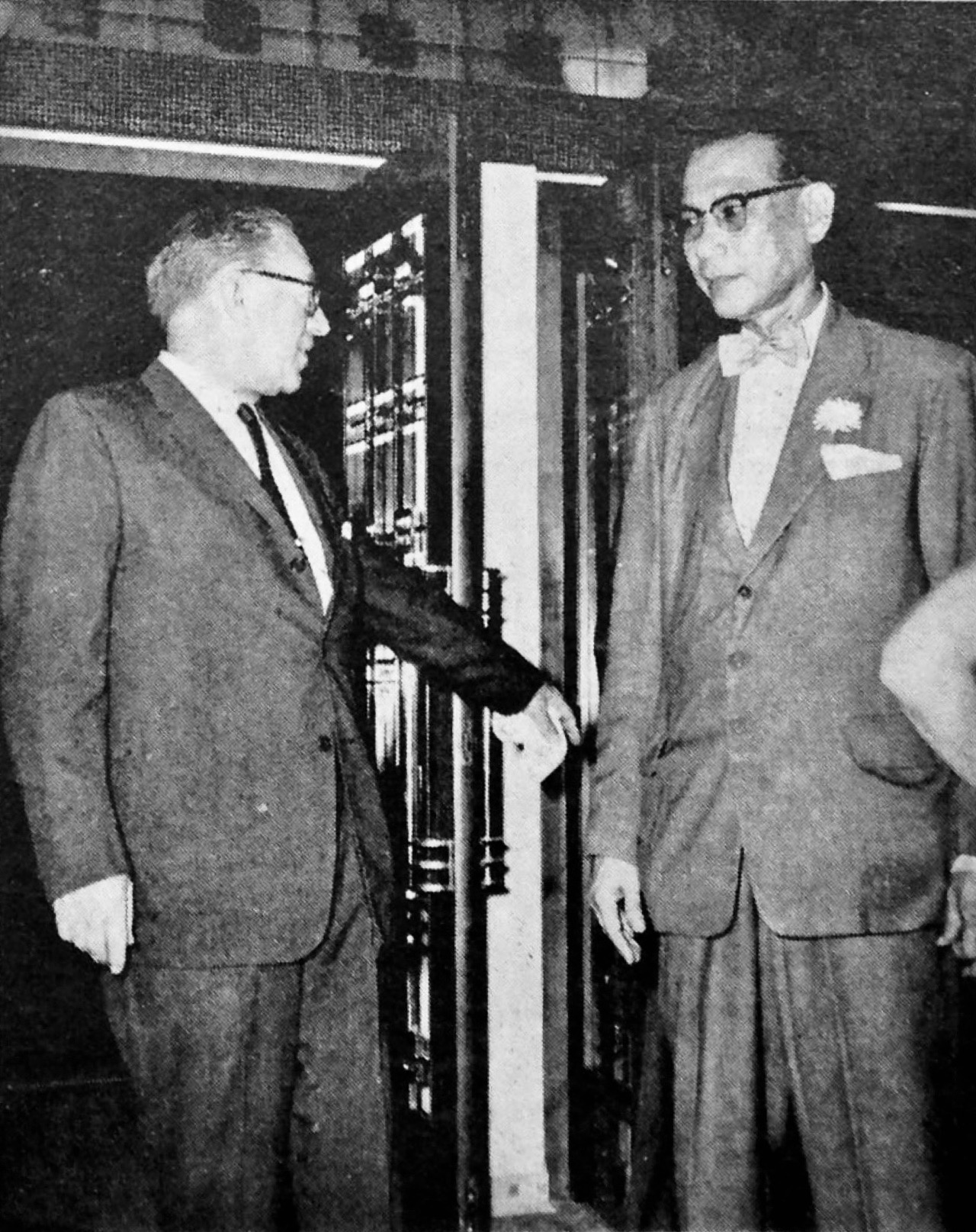
Ibrahim (right) hosting Turnbull (left) at a banquet at the Civic Center in December 1959

Turnbull was consulted by Omar Ali Saifuddien during the appointment process for Brunei's first Chief Minister. Turnbull welcomed the Sultan's choice of Ibrahim Mohammad Jahfar as "the best possible local choice." His recommendation was a gesture of confidence in Ibrahim's administrative experience and extensive service within the British establishment, which Turnbull would have known from Ibrahim's earlier career serving the Resident's office during the 1930s. Turnbull's backing helped ease British concerns during a delicate transition, particularly amidst fears that Malayan influence might encroach on Brunei's internal affairs. Turnbull emphasised the strategic importance of Borneo in the context of post-war geopolitics, arguing that the region would ultimately become the meeting point of British, American, and Australian strategic interests in Southeast Asia. His vision prioritised the broader imperial interest in maintaining influence in the region, particularly in the context of shifting world power dynamics. Turnbull's strategic vision rendered British opposition to early independence or merger with Malaya hesitant, suggesting a desire to safeguard long-term Western interests in Borneo.

==== Warm relations and tensions with Omar Ali Saifuddien ====
Turnbull expressed concern in late 1959 over Omar Ali Saifuddien's growing confidence following the successful implementation of Brunei's written constitution. (Note: Despite their close relationship, Turnbull, like other experienced British officials, struggled to read the Sultan's true intentions on critical issues such as the proposed North Borneo Federation and the introduction of a written constitution for Brunei. The Sultan's calm and genial manner often masked a firm resolve and shrewd political mind, making it difficult even for trusted confidants like Turnbull to draw firm conclusions. This uncertainty was evident in Turnbull's reports to the Colonial Office, which looked to him for reliable insights to inform policy decisions.) While the Sultan was pleased and optimistic about the country's future, Turnbull cautioned that such self-assurance could be "dangerous," warning that the new constitution should be viewed as potentially transitional. His remarks would later appear prescient when the Sultan faced the major political upheaval of the 1962 Brunei revolt. Even in resigning as North Borneo governor in 1959, Turnbull stillbelittled Abell, governor of Sarawak, suggesting in letters that Omar Ali Saifuddien was gratified at the secession of Brunei from Sarawak, butboasting of North Borneo's advancement. To Turnbull, these calculations rendered it reasonable that he had warned againstexpanding authority in a single High Commissioner for all three states.

Turnbull maintained a close personal relationship with Omar Ali Saifuddien and visited him at Istana Darul Hana at the end of 1959. Turnbull unequivocally stated that while the Sultan wished to continue friendly relations with the Federation of Malaya, he observed no sign whatsoever that he desired to have any form of political union with it. Turnbull's judgment was at odds with rumour among other British officials, underscoring his special insight into the Sultan's mind and reinforcing his position as a respected onlooker at a turning point in Brunei political evolution.

==== Resignation ====
Without the approval of the Colonial Office, Turnbull made an unofficial farewell visit to the Sultan prior to his resignation as governor of North Borneo in 1959. Turnbull has remembered his private talks with Omar Ali Saifuddien as "an exhausting marathon" since the Sultan continued to talk throughout the night.

== Later life and death ==
In the late 1950s, Turnbull developed a rapport with emerging local leader Fuad Stephens, demonstrating his openness to engaging with new political voices during a time of increasing public interest in North Borneo's future. This relationship helped raise Stephens's profile and influence within the territory, though it came to an end with Turnbull's death on 23 December 1960.

== Personal life ==
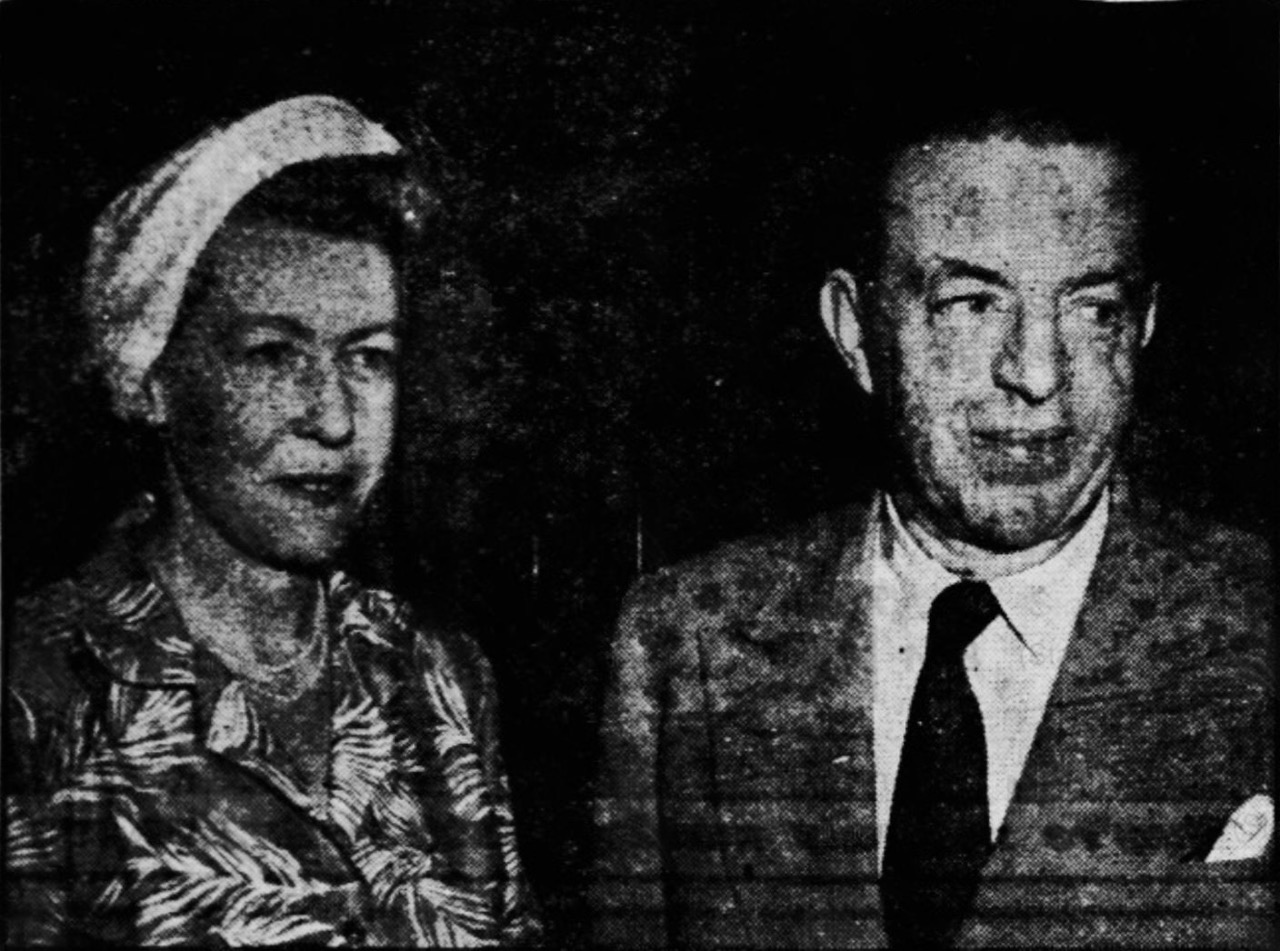
Sylvia Burbidge and Turnbull in 1954

On 9 September 1948, Turnbull married Sylvia Emily Woodman Burbidge, daughter of Woodman Burbidge, 2nd Baronet. He resided at 23 Clarefield Court in Sunningdale, Berkshire, and was fluent in Malay.

== Honours ==
- Commander of the Order of St Michael and St George (CMG; 1946)
- Knight Commander of the Order of St Michael and St George (KCMG; 1956)

== Notes ==
Government offices
Preceded by Sir Ralph Hone	Governor of North Borneo; 1954–1959	Succeeded by Sir William Goode
Diplomatic posts
Preceded by Thomas Carey	British Resident to Brunei; 1934–1937	Succeeded by John Black
