= Governor of North Borneo =

Head of government and commander-in-chief of North Borneo

- Style: His Excellency
- Residence: Sandakan (before 1946), Kota Kinabalu (1946–1963)
- Inaugural holder: William Hood Treacher
- Formation: 1881
- Final holder: Sir William Goode
- Abolished: 1963

The Governor of North Borneo was the appointed head of the government of North Borneo, and later of the Crown Colony of North Borneo.

Originally the Governor was appointed by the North Borneo Chartered Company, which was responsible for the administration of the protectorate. Upon North Borneo becoming a Crown colony in 1946, in the aftermath of the Second World War, the Governor of British North Borneo became an appointee of the Crown (i.e. of the Government of the United Kingdom).

Flag of the governor of North Borneo (1882–1903).

Flag of the governor of North Borneo (1903–1915).

== List of governors appointed by the Company ==
Flag of the governor of North Borneo (1915–1941).

British North Borneo
| No. | Portrait | Name | Tenure | | Monarch |
| No. | Portrait | Name | From | To | Monarch |
|---|---|---|---|---|---|
| 1 | | William Hood Treacher | 1881 | 1887 | Victoria; House of Hanover (20 June 1837 – 22 January 1901) |
| – | | William Maunder Crocker | 1887 | 1888 | Victoria; House of Hanover (20 June 1837 – 22 January 1901) |
| 2 | | Charles Vandeleur Creagh | 1888 | 1895 | Victoria; House of Hanover (20 June 1837 – 22 January 1901) |
| 3 | | Leicester Paul Beaufort | 1895 | 1899 | Victoria; House of Hanover (20 June 1837 – 22 January 1901) |
| 4 | | Hugh Charles Clifford | 1900 | 1901 | Victoria; House of Hanover (20 June 1837 – 22 January 1901) |
| 5 | | Ernest Woodford Birch | 1901 | 1903 | Edward VII; House of Saxe-Coburg and Gotha (22 January 1901 – 6 May 1910) |
| 6 | | Edward Peregrine Gueritz | 1904 | 1907 | Edward VII; House of Saxe-Coburg and Gotha (22 January 1901 – 6 May 1910) |
| – | | Alexander Cook | 1907 | 1907 | Edward VII; House of Saxe-Coburg and Gotha (22 January 1901 – 6 May 1910) |
| 7 | | Edward Peregrine Gueritz | 1907 | 1910 | Edward VII; House of Saxe-Coburg and Gotha (22 January 1901 – 6 May 1910) |
| – | | Aylmer Cavendish Pearson | 1910 | 1911 | George V House of Windsor (6 May 1910 – 20 January 1936) |
| 8 | | Francis Robert Ellis | 1911 | 1912 | George V House of Windsor (6 May 1910 – 20 January 1936) |
| – | | Frederick William Fraser | 1912 | 1912 | George V House of Windsor (6 May 1910 – 20 January 1936) |
| 9 | | James Scott Mason | 1912 | 1912 | George V House of Windsor (6 May 1910 – 20 January 1936) |
| – | | Frederick William Fraser | 1912 | 1913 | George V House of Windsor (6 May 1910 – 20 January 1936) |
| – | | Joseph West Ridgeway | 1913 | 1913 | George V House of Windsor (6 May 1910 – 20 January 1936) |
| 10 | | Cecil William Chase Parr | 1913 | 1915 | George V House of Windsor (6 May 1910 – 20 January 1936) |
| 11 | | Aylmer Cavendish Pearson | 1915 | 1915 | George V House of Windsor (6 May 1910 – 20 January 1936) |
| – | | Frederick William Fraser | 1915 | 1916 | George V House of Windsor (6 May 1910 – 20 January 1936) |
| 12 | | Aylmer Cavendish Pearson | 1916 | 1919 | George V House of Windsor (6 May 1910 – 20 January 1936) |
| – | | Frederick William Fraser | 1919 | 1919 | George V House of Windsor (6 May 1910 – 20 January 1936) |
| 13 | | Aylmer Cavendish Pearson | 1919 | 1922 | George V House of Windsor (6 May 1910 – 20 January 1936) |
| – | | Henry William Lisbrian Bunbury | 1922 | 1922 | George V House of Windsor (6 May 1910 – 20 January 1936) |
| – | | Frederick William Fraser | 1922 | 1922 | George V House of Windsor (6 May 1910 – 20 January 1936) |
| 14 | | William Henry Rycroft | 1922 | 1924 | George V House of Windsor (6 May 1910 – 20 January 1936) |
| – | | Frederick William Fraser | 1924 | 1924 | George V House of Windsor (6 May 1910 – 20 January 1936) |
| 15 | | William Henry Rycroft | 1924 | 1925 | George V House of Windsor (6 May 1910 – 20 January 1936) |
| 16 | | Frederick William Fraser | 1925 | 1925 | George V House of Windsor (6 May 1910 – 20 January 1936) |
| 17 | | Aylmer Cavendish Pearson | 1925 | 1926 | George V House of Windsor (6 May 1910 – 20 January 1936) |
| – | | Frederick William Fraser | 1926 | 1926 | George V House of Windsor (6 May 1910 – 20 January 1936) |
| 18 | | John Lisseter Humphreys | 1926 | 1928 | George V House of Windsor (6 May 1910 – 20 January 1936) |
| – | | Douglas Rider Maxwell | 1928 | 1929 | George V House of Windsor (6 May 1910 – 20 January 1936) |
| 19 | | John Lisseter Humphreys | 1929 | 1930 | George V House of Windsor (6 May 1910 – 20 January 1936) |
| 20 | | Arthur Frederick Richards | 1930 | 1933 | George V House of Windsor (6 May 1910 – 20 January 1936) |
| 21 | | Douglas James Jardine | 1934 | 1937 | George V House of Windsor (6 May 1910 – 20 January 1936) |
| 21 | | Douglas James Jardine | 1934 | 1937 | Edward VIII; House of Windsor (20 January 1936 – 11 December 1936) |
| 21 | | Douglas James Jardine | 1934 | 1937 | George VI; House of Windsor (11 December 1936 – 1 April 1942) |
| 22 | | Charles Robert Smith | 1937 | 1942 | George VI; House of Windsor (11 December 1936 – 1 April 1942) |
Japanese Occupation of British Borneo From 1 April 1942 to 10 June 1945.

== British Military Administration ==
| British Military Administration of Borneo (1945-1946) | | | | Monarch |
| 23 | Charles Robert Smith | 1945 | 1946 | George VI; House of Windsor (10 June 1945 – 6 February 1952) |

== List of Governors appointed by the British Crown ==
Governor of British Crown Colony of North Borneo
- Style: His Excellency
- Appointer: King George VI Queen Elizabeth II
- Inaugural holder: Sir Edward Twining (1946–1949); Succeeded by Sir Ralph Hone (1949–1954); Sir Roland Turnbull (1954–1959)
- Formation: 1946–1963
- Final holder: Sir William Goode (1960–1963)
- Abolished: 16 September 1963 (formed the Federation of Malaysia)
- Superseded by: Sir Edward Twining

Flag of the governor of the Crown Colony of North Borneo (1946–1963).

| Crown Colony of North Borneo | | | | George VI; House of Windsor (10 June 1945 – 6 February 1952) |
| 24 | Edward Francis Twining | 1946 | 5 May 1948 | George VI; House of Windsor (10 June 1945 – 6 February 1952) |
| 25 | James Calder Officer Administering the Colony | 5 May 1948 | 10 January 1949 | George VI; House of Windsor (10 June 1945 – 6 February 1952) |
| 26 | Sir Ralph Hone | 10 January 1949 | 1954 | George VI; House of Windsor (10 June 1945 – 6 February 1952) |
| 26 | Sir Ralph Hone | 10 January 1949 | 1954 | Elizabeth II; House of Windsor (6 February 1952 – 16 September 1963) |
| 27 | Sir Roland Turnbull | 1954 | 1959 | Elizabeth II; House of Windsor (6 February 1952 – 16 September 1963) |
| 28 | Sir William Goode | 1960 | 1963 | Elizabeth II; House of Windsor (6 February 1952 – 16 September 1963) |

== Sources ==
- List of North Borneo Governors on World Statesmen
