= Edward Peregrine Gueritz =

British colonial administrative service officer (1855-1938)

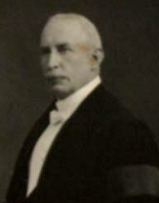

7th Governor of North Borneo
- In office 1903–1912
- Preceded by: Ernest Woodford Birch
- Succeeded by: Francis Robert Ellis

Governor of Labuan
- In office 1903–1906
- Preceded by: Ernest Woodford Birch
- Succeeded by: Office abolished

Personal details
- Born: 18 March 1855
- Died: 3 August 1938 (aged 83) Seaton, Devon
- Children: 1 daughter
- Occupation: Colonial administrative service officer

Edward Peregrine Gueritz (18 March 1855 – 3 August 1938) was a British colonial administrator who served as Governor of Labuan and Governor of North Borneo at the beginning of the 20th century.

== Early life and education ==
Gueritz was born on 18 March 1855. He was educated privately and at St Andrews Collegiate School, Stoke Newington.

== Career ==
Gueritz joined the Sarawak civil service in 1874 and served until 1877 before he went to work for the Bank of New Zealand in Christchurch. In 1880, he went to North Borneo where he served as Assistant Resident (1882–1884). In 1885, he joined the civil service of the Federated Malay States and was posted to Sungei Ujong and Jelebu as Collector of Land Revenue and Magistrate.

In 1890, he rejoined the North Borneo service where he was appointed Resident of Labuan in 1892 while also serving as Acting Government Secretary before he returned to England and spent a year on sick leave. Returning to North Borneo in 1893, he served in various posts including Postmaster-General of North Borneo and Labuan (1894); editor of the British North Borneo Herald; Acting Secretary to the Governor; Sessions Judge; Acting District Officer, Sandakan; Deputy Governor (1896); and Superintendent of the Public Works Department (1897).

In 1898, he was appointed Government Secretary, North Borneo and the following year served as Acting Commissioner in the absence of the Governor. From 1901 to 1903, he served as Judicial Commissioner and Judge, and wrote the first complete compilation of the laws of North Borneo: Proclamations and Notifications of the State of North Borneo 1883–1902.

From 1903 to 1906, he served as Governor and Commander-in-Chief of Labuan, and from 1903 to 1912, as Governor and Commander-in-Chief of North Borneo. As the first member of the Borneo civil service to be appointed Governor, during his tenure prosperity and trade increased while he also oversaw the beginning of the boom in the rubber industry. In 1911, he resigned and retired to England.

== Personal life and death ==
Gueritz married Anne Maria Cole in 1886 and they had a daughter. When she died in 1930, he married Louisa Finch in 1932. He died on 3 August 1938, aged 83, in Seaton, Devon.
