= John Lisseter Humphreys =

British colonial administrator (1881-1929)

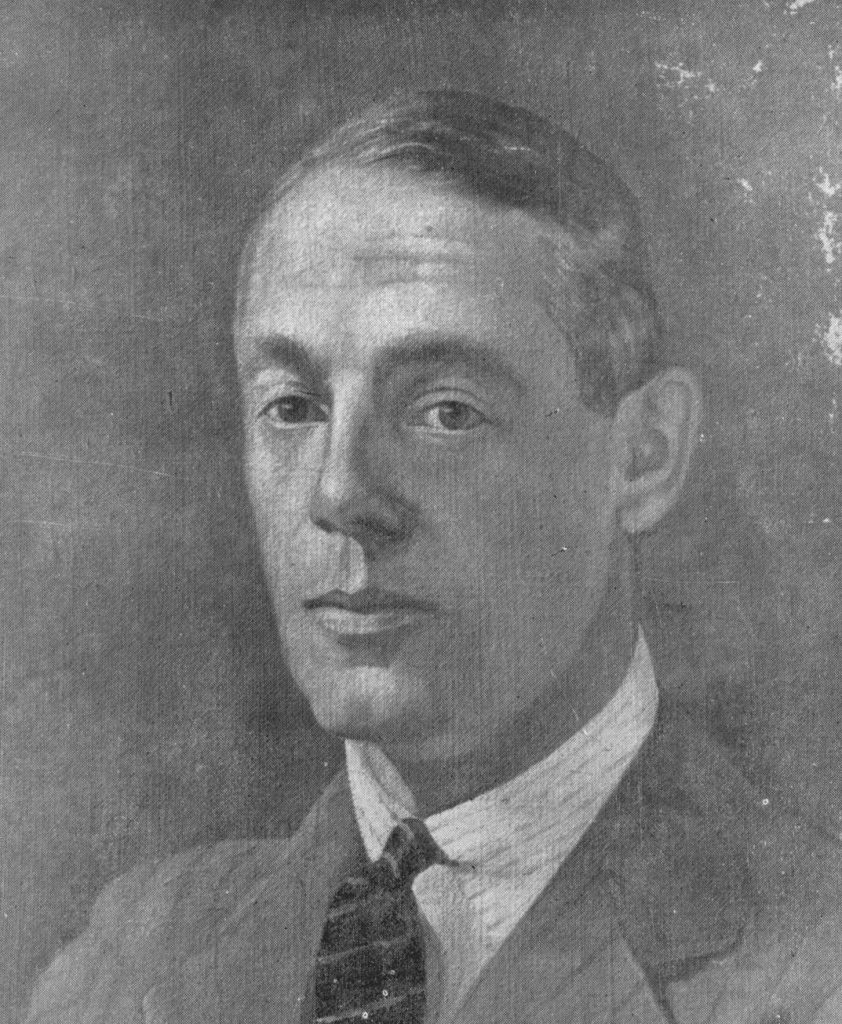
24 January 1990

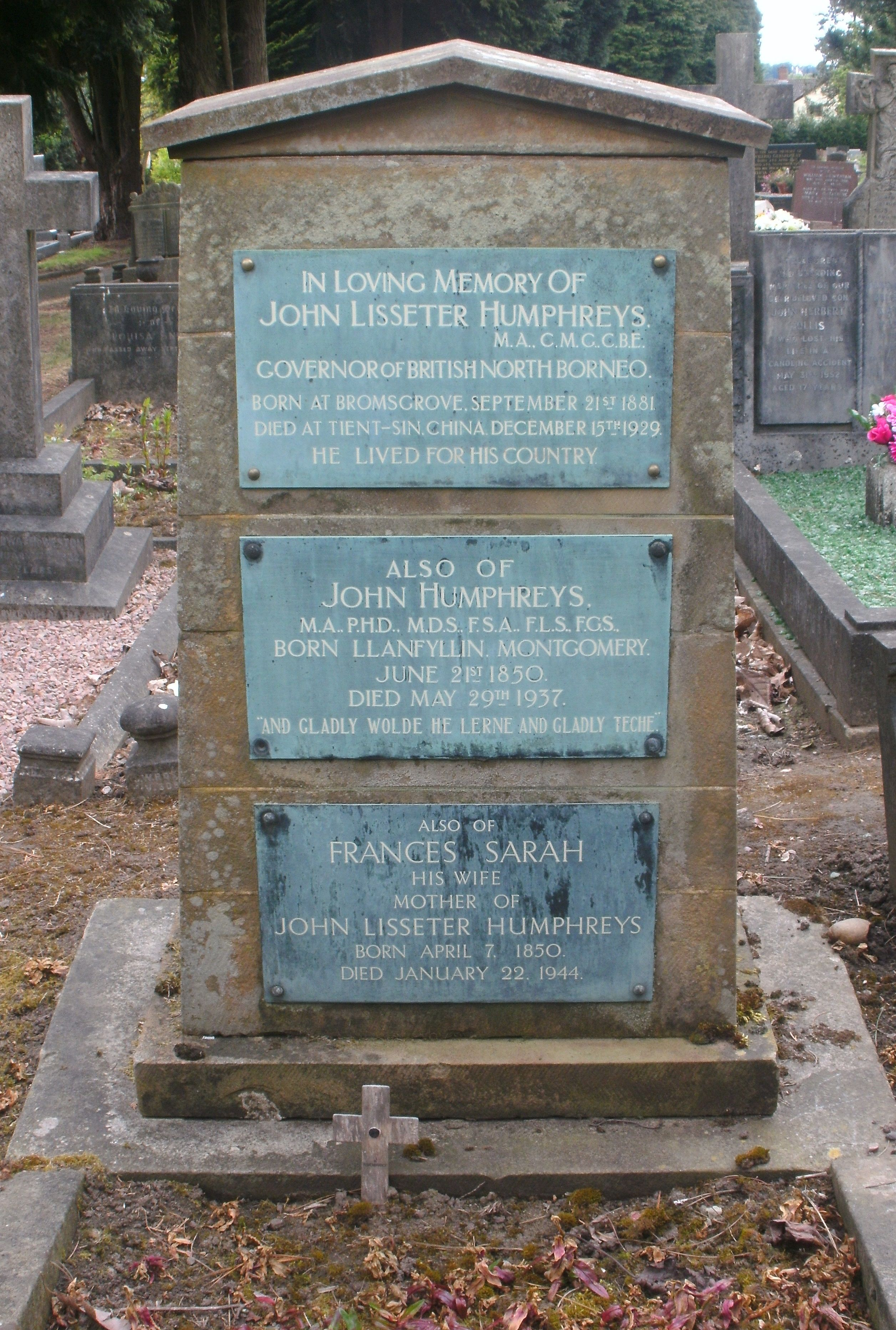
Grave of the Humphreys family, located in the churchyard at St John the Baptist Church, Bromsgrove

John Lisseter Humphreys CMG CBE (21 September 1881 – 15 December 1929) was a British colonial administrator, and Governor of North Borneo from 15 October 1926 until his death while on leave in China in December 1929.

Humphreys was educated at Bromsgrove School. He was a senior classical scholar of Brasenose College, Oxford and entered the Straits Settlement Civil Service in 1905 as Cadet. Among other appointments he has been a magistrate in Singapore and Penang. He was British Agent at Terengganu from 1916–1919; Adviser at Terengganu from 1919–25, Adviser at Kedah from 1925–1926, before being appointed Governor of North Borneo in October 1926. During his furlough in late 1929, he contracted pneumonia and was rushed to the hospital in Tientsin where he succumbed due to a heart failure on the afternoon of Sunday, 15 December.

Humphreys was appointed a Commander of the Order of the British Empire (CBE) in the 1925 Birthday Honours, and a Companion of the Order of St Michael and St George (CMG) in the 1928 Birthday Honours.

== Notes ==
Government offices
Preceded by Aylmer Cavendish Pearson 2nd appt.	Governor of North Borneo; 1926–1929	Succeeded by Arthur Frederick Richards
