= Robert Smith (colonial administrator) =

Governor of North Borneo (1887–1959)

Sir (Charles) Robert Smith KBE CMG (13 November 1887 – 4 November 1959) was a British Governor of North Borneo from 1937 until 18 January 1942, and again from 11 September 1945 until October 1946. During the period from 1942–1945 during World War II, North Borneo was under Japanese occupation and Smith's Governorship was suspended.

Smith was educated at Christ's Hospital, and joined the North Borneo Civil Service as a cadet in 1913. He was appointed Governor and Commander-in-Chief of North Borneo in 1937. He was awarded the CMG in 1941.

Smith was interned by the Japanese at Berhala Island near Sandakan in North Borneo and then at Batu Lintang camp, Sarawak, Borneo, from 18 January 1942 until May 1943, after which time he was transferred to another camp in Manchuria, and he was in a camp in Formosa in late 1943.

After the war he took up his position as Governor briefly, before retiring in October 1946. He was awarded the KBE in 1947, and died in 1959.

== Marriages ==
Smith married twice. In 1920 he married Violet Mure Slight, and they had a son and a daughter. In 1948 he married Gwendoline Jessie Holdcroft.

== Notes ==
Government offices
Preceded by Douglas James Jardine	Governor of North Borneo; 1937–1946	Succeeded by Edward Francis Twining
