= Edward Twining =

British diplomat (1899–1967)

The Right Honourable The Lord Twining GCMG MBE KStJ
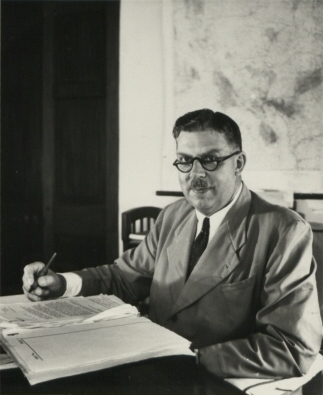

Governor of Tanganyika
- In office 18 June 1949 – 16 June 1958
- Monarchs: George VI; Elizabeth II
- Preceded by: Sir William Battershill
- Succeeded by: Sir Richard Turnbull

Governor of North Borneo
- In office 1946–1949
- Monarch: George VI
- Preceded by: Robert Smith
- Succeeded by: Sir Ralph Hone

Commissioner of Saint Lucia
- In office 1944–1946
- Monarch: George VI
- Preceded by: Arthur Alban Wright
- Succeeded by: John Montague Stow

Personal details
- Born: Edward Francis Twining; 29 June 1899 Westminster, England
- Died: 21 June 1967 (aged 67) Westminster, England
- Spouse: Helen Mary Du Buisson (m. 1928)
- Children: 2
- Occupation: Diplomat, colonial governor
- Military career
- Allegiance: United Kingdom
- Branch: British Army
- Service years: 1919-1922
- Units: Worcestershire Regiment; King's African Rifles

Edward Francis Twining, Baron Twining GCMG MBE KStJ (29 June 1899 – 21 June 1967), known as Sir Edward Twining from 1949 to 1958, was a British diplomat, formerly Governor of North Borneo and Governor of Tanganyika. He was a member of the Twining tea family. In 1960 he published a book titled A History of the Crown Jewels of Europe; at over 700 pages it is probably the most extensive book on the subject.

== Early and personal life ==
Twining was born in 1899 in Westminster to William Henry Greaves Twining, vicar of St Stephen's, Rochester Row, London and his wife, Agatha Georgina, fourth daughter of Lieutenant-Colonel Robert Bourne. His brother Stephan Twining became the managing director of the tea merchants, Twinings. He was a Provost scholar to Lancing before training at the Royal Military College, Sandhurst.

He married Helen Mary, daughter of Arthur Edmund Du Buisson, in 1928 and they had two sons.

== Army and wartime service ==
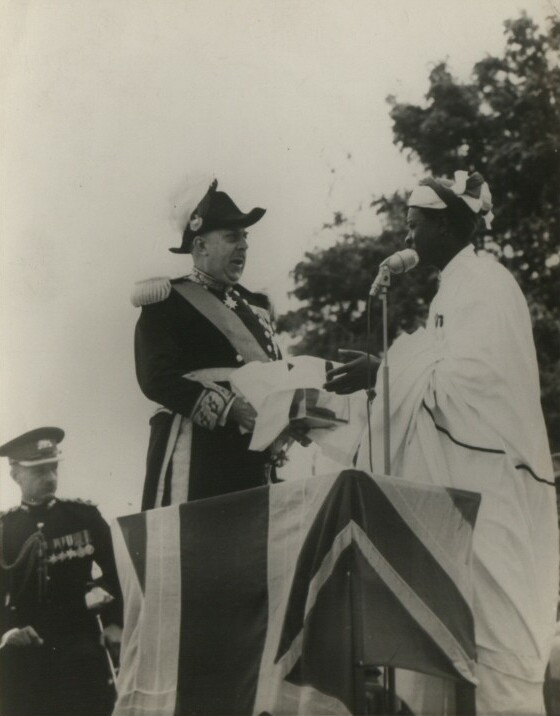
Sir Edward Twining returning the skull of Chief Mkwawa

He served in Dublin with the Worcestershire Regiment between 1919 and 1922, inadvertently capturing Éamon de Valera in 1921. He was appointed MBE for his services in Ireland. He then entered the colonial administrative service following two tours of Uganda with the 4th King's African Rifles, returning there in 1929 as an assistant district commissioner. He moved to Mauritius as director of labour in 1939, and on his own initiative launched a secret operation to monitor enemy signals. At first he was working on Vichy French signals from Madagascar and Réunion, with the help of a growing number of assistants recruited on Mauritius. Amongst them were his sister-in-law, Evelyn DuBuisson (1895-1983), who arrived in Mauritius in 1939 for a summer holiday and stayed for most of the war, having discovered that she had a talent for codebreaking. At first Twining's operation focused on traffic in European languages, but once Britain had declared war on Japan following the attacks on Pearl Harbor and Malaya in December 1941, he and his team began working on Japanese signals. Owing to Mauritius' position in the Indian Ocean and the high altitude of the wireless intercept station on Mauritius, he was able to intercept signals that could not be intercepted elsewhere and he and his team learnt enough Japanese to be able to translate Japanese wireless traffic sent en clair. The value of the intercept station he ran on Mauritius was recognised by the Royal Navy and by Bletchley Park, and in order to enhance the capability of Twining's operation three of the graduates of the secret Bedford Japanese School run by Captain Oswald Tuck RN were sent out to Mauritius: they were trained not only in Japanese but also in codebreaking. Twining's operation was extraordinarily successful but it remained secret until long after the end of the war and he omitted any mention of it from his draft autobiography. In 1943 he became administrator in St Lucia; he was appointed Companion of the Order of St Michael and St George in the same year.

== Colonial service: Imperial governor ==
Twining served as Governor of North Borneo from 2 December 1946. In 1949 he was promoted to KCMG and became Governor of Tanganyika on 16 May, serving there until 1958. He was promoted to GCMG in 1953. This was prompted largely because, as a governor of a colony under the auspices of United Nations supervision, he was more than happy to receive Inspectors to the east African country on biennial missions. In 1952 he had already paved the way for independence in 1961 by trialling an all-communities constitutional arrangement that guaranteed democratic representation for minority populations in the state that would become Tanzania.

== House of Lords ==
Following his retirement, he became a life peer as Baron Twining, of Tanganyika and of Godalming in the County of Surrey, on 22 August 1958. Lord Twining made his maiden speech on 27 July 1959 during the debate on the Colonial Development Corporation. Colonial governors had always had difficulty developing East African countries, given the huge distances between scattered populations, and the tendency of African politics to fragment into tribal loyalties. However, back in London he encouraged development corporations to work closely with governments and business to secure more investment in African territories. Describing himself as a "paternal governor", he called for better organized schemes because they were "rather haphazard". He warned that the Westminster system should not be imposed upon Africa, rather that the local leaders should be allowed to draft their own party political arrangements to articulate independence movements. Like most Liberal-leaning politicians, he was sympathetic to self-determination, largely because it stimulated progress or debate on the progress of institutional development towards the principles of freedom. After independence, the African states suffered large-scale migration; hundreds of thousands of displaced persons became stateless. Twining was among those peers who asked the Commonwealth Office to donate more money to alleviate the world refugee crisis.

Twining was among those peers who opposed the second reading of the Misrepresentation Bill, a flagship piece of fraud legislation for the Wilson Government.

== Other achievements ==
He was appointed a Knight of the Venerable Order of Saint John in 1950. He also served as Honorary Colonel to 6th Battalion King's African Rifles from 1955 to 1958.

Edward Twining also worked to expand the operations of factories in Tanzania, including the cotton gin at Murutunguru on Ukerewe Island, Tanzania. The cornerstone exists there to this day.

Coat of arms of Edward Twining
| Crest A dexter cubit arm grasping in the hand two snakes entwined round the arm Proper and charged on the forearm with a millrind Or. Escutcheon Sable a fess embattled between in chief two mullets and in base a millrind Or. Supporters On the dexter a crested crane, on the sinister a giraffe, both Proper. Motto Fortiter Ac Firmiter |

== Publications ==
- A History of the Crown Jewels of Europe. London: B. T. Batsford, 1960.
- European Regalia. London: B. T. Batsford, 1967.

Government offices
| Preceded by Arthur Alban Wright | Governor of Saint Lucia; 1944–1946 | Succeeded by John Montague Stow |
| Preceded by Robert Smith | Governor of North Borneo; 1946–1949 | Succeeded by Sir Ralph Hone |
| Preceded by Sir William Battershill | Governor of Tanganyika; 1949–1958 | Succeeded by Sir Richard Turnbull |
