= Ralph Hone =

British colonial administrator

Major-General Sir Ralph Hone KCMG KBE MC KStJ TD
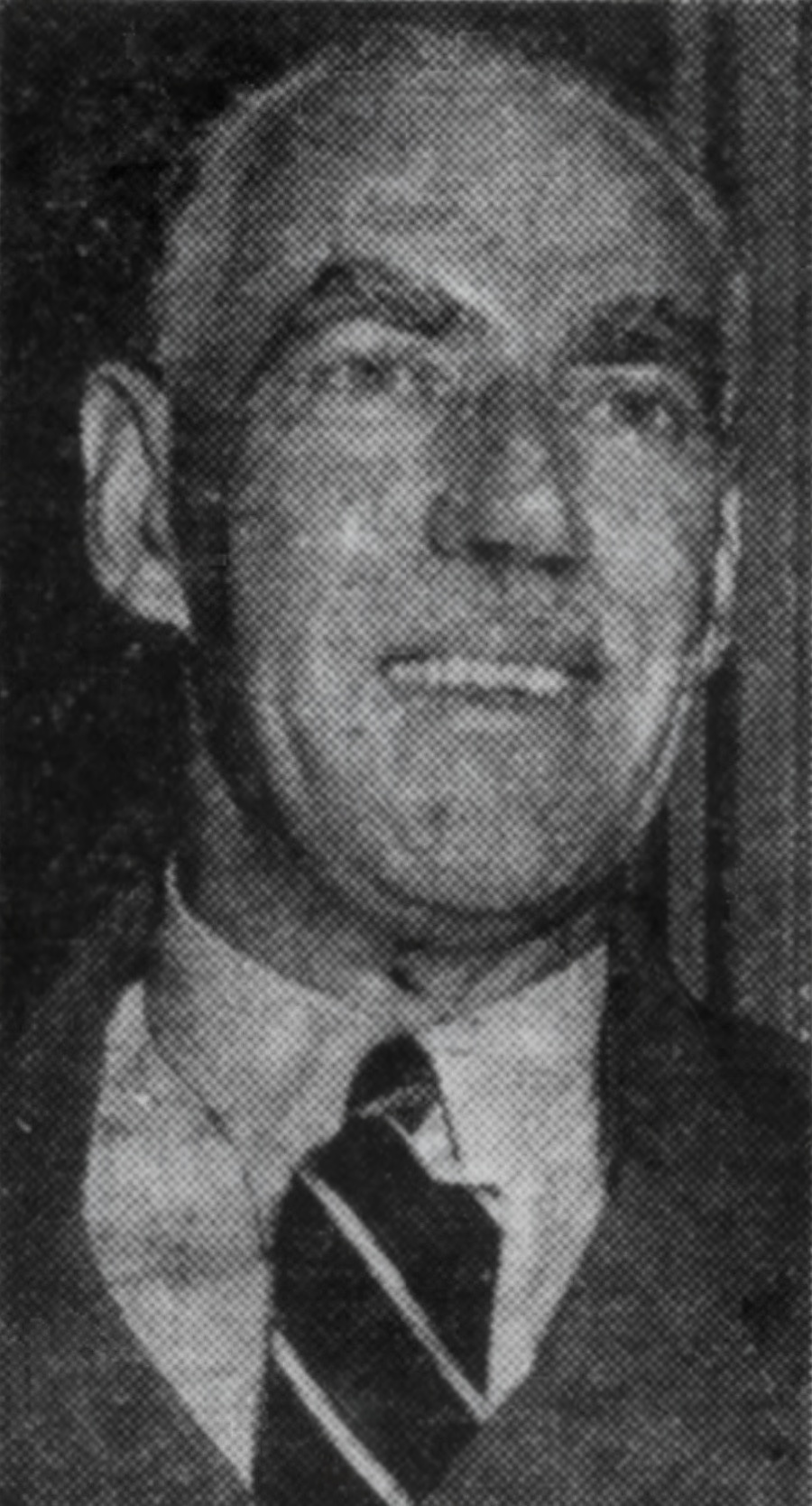
- Hone in 1951

Governor of North Borneo
- In office 10 January 1950 – 1954
- Monarch: Elizabeth II
- Preceded by: Edward Twining
- Succeeded by: Roland Evelyn Turnbull

Attorney General of Uganda
- In office 1937–1943
- Monarch: George V
- Preceded by: James Reali Gregg
- Succeeded by: Neville Harry Turton

Attorney General of Gibraltar
- In office 1933–1936
- Preceded by: Maxwell Hendry Anderson
- Succeeded by: Mansell Reece

President of The Uganda Society.
- In office 1937–1938
- Preceded by: H. Jowitt
- Succeeded by: John Sykes

Personal details
- Born: 3 May 1896 Hove, Sussex, England
- Died: 28 November 1992 (aged 96)
- Education: University of London
- Occupation: Military officer, barrister and diplomat

Military service
- Allegiance: United Kingdom
- Branch/service: British Army
- Years of service: 1915–1920; 1941–1945
- Rank: Major General
- Unit: Inns of Court Regiment; London Irish Rifles
- Commands: Uganda Defence Force; Middle East Command; South East Asia Command
- Battles/wars: First World War; Second World War
- Awards: Knight Commander of the Order of St Michael and St George; Knight Commander of the Order of the British Empire; Military Cross; Territorial Decoration

Major-General Sir Herbert Ralph Hone, KCMG, KBE, MC, KStJ, TD (3 May 1896 – 28 November 1992) was a British Army officer, barrister and colonial administrator.

== Early life ==
Ralph Hone was born in Hove, Sussex, and was educated at Varndean Grammar School, Brighton. Hone's mother died while he was in his teens; his father, "a man of character", went on to become mayor of Brighton in 1937. His family, the Hones, were distant relations to Nathaniel Hone the Elder of the famous painting, writing, cricket and diplomatic dynasty the Hones. However, Ralph's upbringing was far removed from that of his forebears.

== First World War ==
In April 1915 Hone passed the British civil service examination. He then joined the Inns of Court Regiment and was commissioned in July 1915 in the London Irish Rifles. He was posted to the 1/18th battalion and was involved in the Battle of Loos in autumn 1915. Hone served in the Notre Dame de Lorette sector and then at Vimy Ridge. During this time Hone was hospitalised with acute trench fever and impetigo. He was promoted to lieutenant on 14 April 1917, and to acting captain on 14 January 1918.

On 21 March 1918, the Germans opened their Spring Offensive with 6000 guns. Hone's company halted the German's first infantry assault, capturing 25 German prisoners. Hone was awarded the Military Cross for his actions when the Germans attempted to enfilade the British lines, becoming severely wounded in the process. The full citation for the medal appeared in The London Gazette in September 1918 and reads as follows:

For conspicuous gallantry and devotion to duty when in command of a company. He led his men with skill and courage and drove out a party of the enemy who had penetrated into his trench. Later, he held the right flank of his battalion against a determined bombing attack, when he was severely wounded. By his action and example he undoubtedly saved the situation at a critical moment.

He was repatriated to England, and by the end of the war had been promoted to a captain. The day after the armistice with Germany in November he married Elizabeth Matthews (b. 1894/95), with whom he later had two children, a son and daughter.

== Interwar period ==
In 1920, Hone left the army and joined the colonial service in Uganda. He trained as a barrister and on his first long leave was called to the bar by the Middle Temple in 1924, during which time he aided in the prosecution of Patrick Mahon, the perpetrator of the Crumbles murders. The next year, he was appointed Zanzibar's registrar to the high court; followed by resident magistrate. His legal career continued with an appointment as crown counsel in Tanganyika, followed by Attorney General of Gibraltar (1933–36). While he was in Gibraltar the Spanish Civil War broke out; domestic duties included acting as chairman of the Gibraltar government slum clearance commission. From Gibraltar he was posted to Uganda from 1937 to 1943, as Attorney General of Uganda.

=== Second World War ===
Hone was made commandant of the Uganda Defence Force following the outbreak of the Second World War. In 1941, he was transferred to General Headquarters Middle East, first as legal advisor to advise on law in the conquered Italian territories and later as chief political officer. In March 1943, he was promoted to major-general, "to ease his command over the Brigadiers under him"; he was also appointed a Commander of the Order of the British Empire.

This was followed by a period in the War Office in London, dealing with the war situation in South-East Asia. While working at South East Asia Command (SEAC) headquarters he got to know Louis Mountbatten, later Earl Mountbatten of Burma. In August 1945, Hone was sent to Malaya, to oversee the handover to civilian rule, and was present at the Japanese surrender at Singapore on 12 September.

== Later years ==
Hone married again in 1945, and had a son by his second wife Sybil. Hone was awarded the Knight Commander of the KBE in 1946. He served as Secretary-General to the Governor-General of Malaya for two years from 1946, followed by Deputy Commissioner-General in south-east Asia from 1948 to 1949, and in 1949 he was appointed Governor and Commander-in-Chief of North Borneo. Hone was considered a great success as Governor of North Borneo, encouraging the country's recovery from the ravages of the Japanese occupation and expanding the colony's export trades. He was appointed a Knight Commander of the Order of St Michael and St George in 1951.

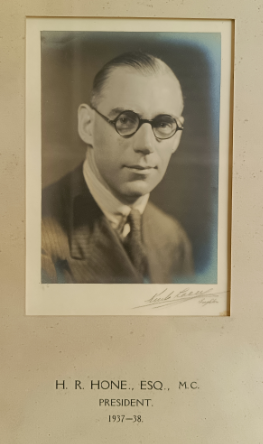
H.R Hone

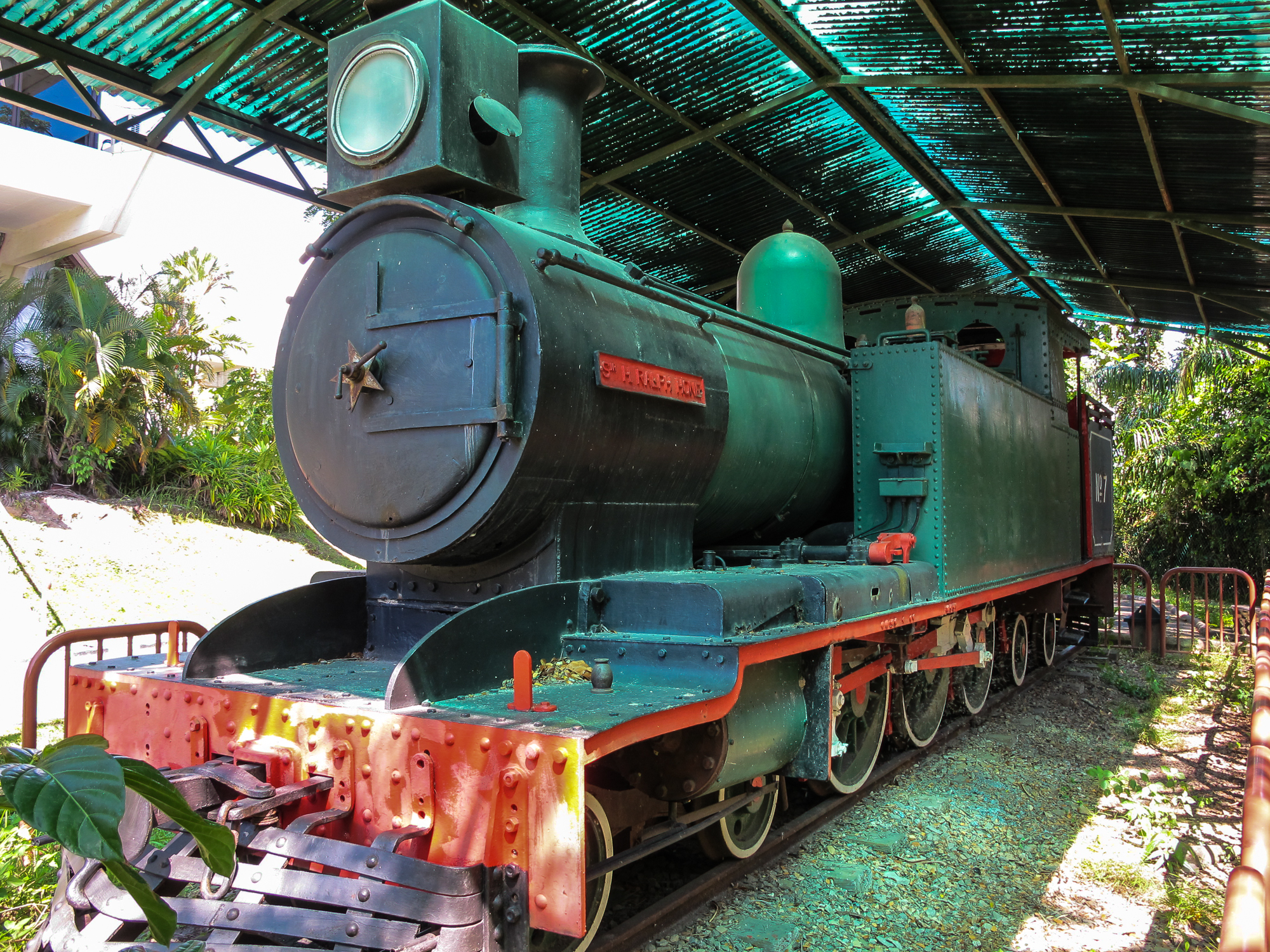
"Sir H. Ralph Hone" displayed in the Sabah Museum

Hone was head of the legal division of the Commonwealth Relations Office from 1954 to 1961, when he retired from the civil service, and resumed practice at the bar. Given his background in diplomacy and overseas service, he also held many important advisory posts both at home and overseas: his final advisership was to the Bermudan government from July to November 1966.

Hone was Vice President of the Royal Commonwealth Society. He was also an active freemason, a member of the higher degree of freemasonry, the Ancient and Accepted (Scottish) Rite 33º. Hone was also Bailiff Grand Cross of the Venerable Order of St John. He died on 28 November 1992.

An archive of Hone's papers dating from 1937 to 1972 has been deposited at the Bodleian Library of Commonwealth and African Studies at Rhodes House, part of the University of Oxford. The reference for the records is MSS Brit Emp s 407, MSS Ind Ocn s 271.

In addition, the papers of Louis Francis Albert Victor Nicholas George Mountbatten, 1st Earl Mountbatten of Burma held at Southampton University Library include correspondence with Hone relating to South East Asia Command 1944–1946. The reference for the records is MB1/C124.

A steam engine was named in his honour, the Hunslet-built 40604T "Sir H. Ralph Hone", which is now displayed in the Sabah Museum, Kota Kinabalu, Sabah.

== Books ==
- Revised Edition of the Laws of Gibraltar in Force on 31 December 1935 Gibraltar: Benedict R Miles for Gibraltar Garrison Library Committee, 1936
- The Statute Law of the Bahama Islands, 1799–1965 in Force on 1 April 1965 Nassau: Government of the Colony of the Bahama Islands, 1965
- The Subsidiary Legislation of the Bahama Islands, 1799–1965 Nassau: Government of the Colony of the Bahama Islands, 1965

== Notes ==
Government offices
Preceded by Edward Francis Twining	Governor of North Borneo; 1950–1954	Succeeded by Sir Roland Evelyn Turnbull
