= North Borneo =

British protectorate in Asia from 1877 to 1946

North Borneo: Borneo Utara (Malay); 北婆羅洲 (Chinese)
- 1881–1942; 1945–1946
- Flag Badge
- Motto: Latin: Pergo et Perago (I persevere and I achieve)
- Anthem: God Save the Queen (1881–1901); God Save the King (1901–1942; 1945–1946)
- Map of North Borneo, 1903
- Status: Protectorate of the United Kingdom
- Capital: Kudat (1881–1884); Sandakan (1884–1945); Jesselton (1946)
- Common languages: English, Kadazan-Dusun, Bajau, Murut, Lundayeh, Rungus, Paitan, Sabah Malay, Chinese etc.
- Religion: Islam; Christianity; Buddhism; Confucianism; Taoism; Chinese folk religion Animism/tribal folk religions
- Monarch
  - 1881–1901: Victoria (first)
  - 1936–1942, 1945–1946: George VI (last)
- Governor
  - 1881–1887: William Hood Treacher (first)
  - 1937–1946: Charles Robert Smith (last)
- Historical era: New Imperialism
  - North Borneo Provisional Association Ltd: 26 August 1881
  - Granted royal charter: 1 November 1881
  - North Borneo Chartered Company: May 1882
  - Protectorate: 12 May 1888
  - Japanese invasion: 2 January 1942
  - Allied liberation: 10 June 1945
  - Ceded to the Crown colony: 15 July 1946
- Currency: North Borneo dollar
Preceded by
Bruneian Empire
Sultanate of Sulu
Sultanate of Bulungan
Crown Colony of Labuan
Succeeded by
Japanese occupation of British Borneo
British Military Administration (Borneo)
Crown Colony of North Borneo
- Today part of: Malaysia

North Borneo (usually known as British North Borneo, also known as the State of North Borneo) was a British protectorate in the northern part of the island of Borneo (present-day Sabah). The territory of North Borneo was originally established by concessions of the Sultanates of Brunei and Sulu in 1877 and 1878 to a German-born representative of Austria-Hungary, businessman and diplomat, Gustav Overbeck.

Overbeck had recently purchased a small tract of land on the western coast of Borneo in 1876 from American merchant Joseph William Torrey, who had promoted the territory in Hong Kong since 1866. Overbeck then transferred all his rights to Alfred Dent before withdrawing in 1879. In 1881, Dent established the North Borneo Provisional Association Ltd to manage the territory, which was granted a royal charter in the same year. The following year, the Provisional Association was replaced by the North Borneo Chartered Company. The granting of a royal charter worried both the neighbouring Spanish and Dutch authorities; as a result, the Spanish began to stake their claim of northern Borneo. A protocol known as the Madrid Protocol was signed in 1885 to recognise Spanish presence in the Philippine archipelago, in return establishing the definite border of Spanish influence beyond northern Borneo. To avoid further claims from other European powers, North Borneo was made a British protectorate in 1888.

As the population was too small to effectively serve the economy, coupled with British administration policy at the time restricting indigenous participation in the economy to maintain their traditional life and concentrate on their own economic endeavours, the British sponsored various migration schemes for Chinese workers from Hong Kong and China to work in the European plantations, Javanese and Buginese from the neighbouring Dutch East Indies, and Japanese immigrants to participate in the economic activities of North Borneo. The start of World War II with the arrival of Japanese forces brought an end to protectorate administration, with the territory placed under a military administration and then designated as a Crown colony.

== History ==
=== Foundation and early years ===
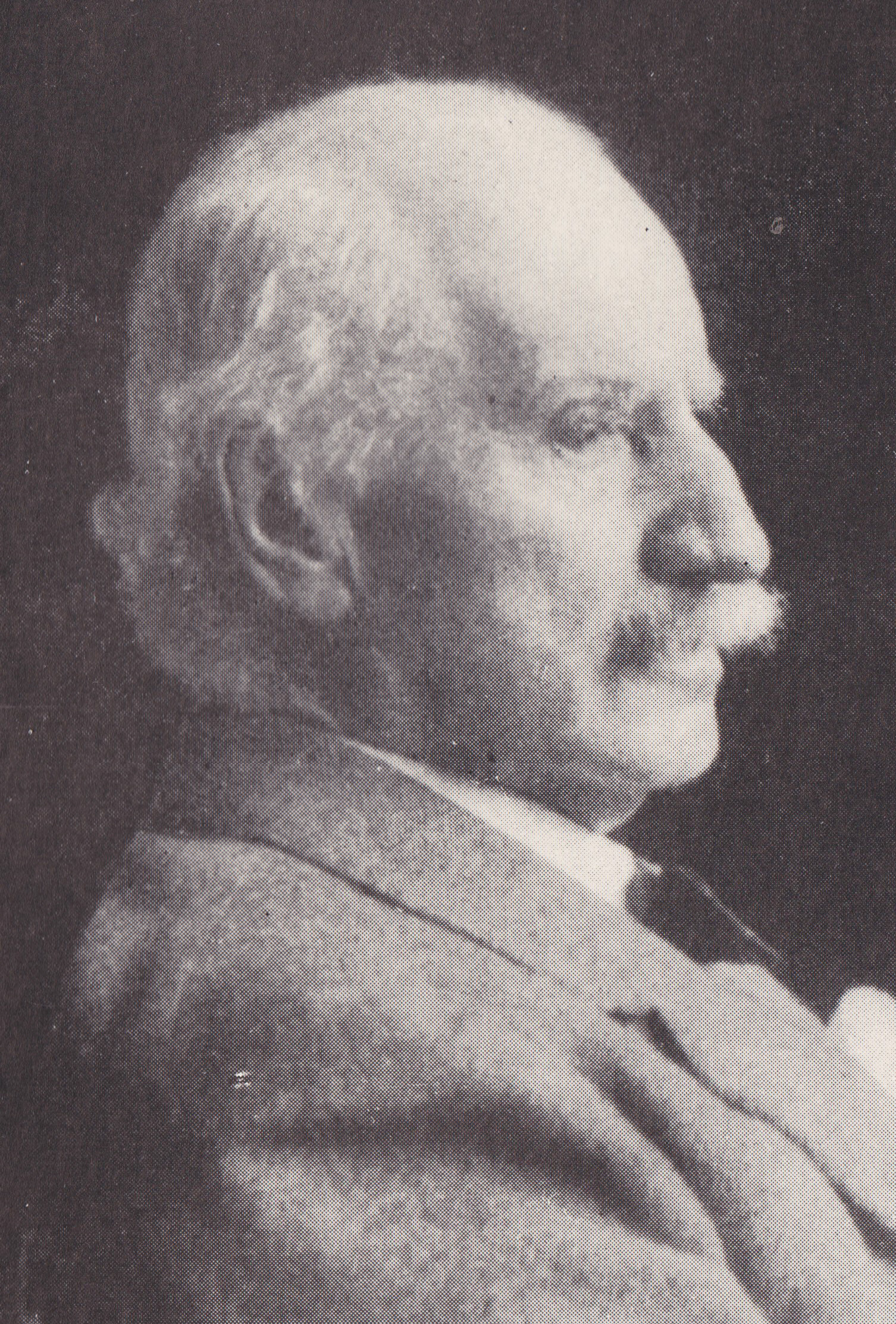
Alfred Dent, the founder of the North Borneo Provisional Association Ltd (later replaced by the North Borneo Chartered Company), was the key player in establishing a solid British presence in northern Borneo.

North Borneo was founded in 1877–1878 through a series of land concessions in northern Borneo from the Sultanate of Brunei and Sulu to an Austrian-German businessman and diplomat, Gustav Overbeck. A former American Trading Company of Borneo territory on the western coast of northern Borneo had already passed to Overbeck, requiring him to go to Brunei to renew the concession of the land he bought from Joseph William Torrey. William Clark Cowie played an important role as a close friend of the Sultanate of Sulu in helping Overbeck to buy additional land on the eastern coast of Borneo. Meanwhile, the Sultanate of Bulungan's influence also reached Tawau on the south-eastern coast, but came under the influence of the more powerful Sultanate of Sulu.

Following his success in leasing large tracts of land from both the western and eastern parts of northern Borneo, Overbeck went to Europe to promote the territory in Austria-Hungary and Italy as well as in his own country of Germany, but none showed any real interest. Only Great Britain, which had sought to control trade routes in the Far East since the 18th century, responded. The interest of the British was strengthened by their presence in the Crown Colony of Labuan since 1846. As a result, Overbeck received financial support from the British Dent brothers (Alfred Dent and Edward Dent) and diplomatic and military support from the British government. Following the support from Britain, a clause was included in the treaties that the ceded territories could not be sold or given to another party without the permission of the British government.

Unable to attract the interest of the governments of Austria, Italy and Germany, Overbeck withdrew in 1879; all his treaty rights with the Sultanates were transferred to Alfred Dent, who in 1881 formed the North Borneo Provisional Association Ltd with the support of countrymen Rutherford Alcock, Admiral Henry Keppel, Richard Biddulph Martin, Admiral Richard Mayne, and William Henry Read. The Provisional Association then applied to Queen Victoria for a royal charter, which was granted on 1 November 1881. William Hood Treacher was appointed as the first governor, and Kudat at the northern tip of Borneo was chosen as the Provisional Association administration capital. The granting of the royal charter had worried both the Dutch and the Spanish, who feared that Britain might threaten the position of their colonies.

In May 1882, the Provisional Association was replaced by the newly formed North Borneo Chartered Company, with Alcock acting as the first President and Dent becoming the company managing director. The administration is not considered a British acquisition of the territory, but rather a private enterprise with government guidelines to protect the territory from being encroached upon by other European powers. Under Governor Treacher, the company gained more territories on the western coast from the Sultanate of Brunei. The company subsequently acquired further sovereign and territorial rights from the Sultan of Brunei, expanding the territory under their control to the Putatan River (May 1884), the Padas district (November 1884), the Kawang River (February 1885), the Mantanani Islands (April 1885) and additional minor Padas territories (March 1898). (Note: See Treaties and Engagements and Orders of Her Britannic Majesty in Council.)

At the early stage of the administration, there was a claim in northern Borneo by the Spanish authorities in the Philippines, and an attempt to raise the Spanish flag over Sandakan was met with interference by a British warship. To prevent further conflict and to end the Spanish claim to northern Borneo, in 1885 an agreement known as the Madrid Protocol was signed in Madrid between the United Kingdom, Germany and Spain, recognising the Spanish presence in the Philippine archipelago. As the company did not wish to be involved in further foreign affairs issues, North Borneo was made a British Protectorate on 12 May 1888. In 1890, the Crown Colony of Labuan was incorporated into the administration of North Borneo, before returning to direct British rule in 1904. There were several local insurrections from 1894 to 1900 by Mat Salleh and by Antanum in 1915. The First World War did not greatly affect the territory, and logging business grew during the interwar period.

=== World War II and decline ===
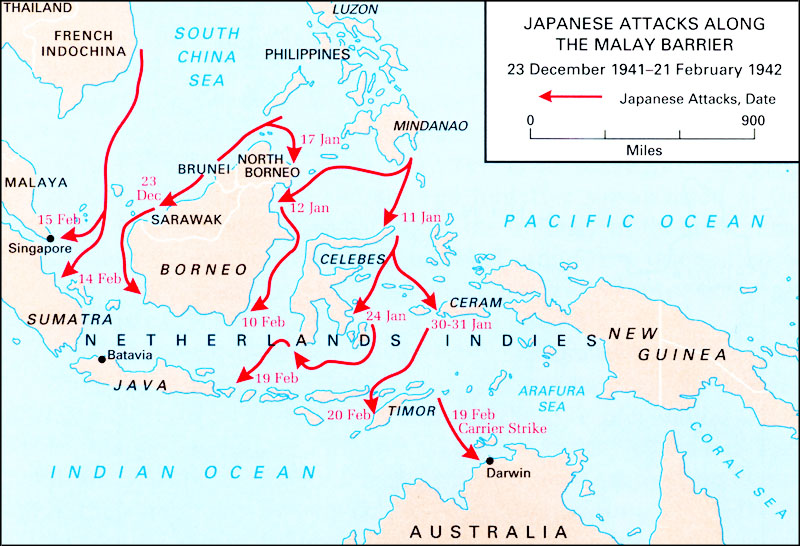
Japanese military movement throughout the Malay Archipelago from 1941 to 1942

During World War II, the Japanese invasion of Borneo began with the unopposed landing of the Japanese forces at Miri and Seria on 16 December 1941, with the objective of securing oil supplies. On 1 January 1942, the Japanese navy landed unopposed in Labuan. The next day, the Japanese landed at Mempakul in North Borneo. After negotiations with the Officers-in-charge of Jesselton for its surrender, while they were waiting for troop reinforcements, Jesselton was occupied by the Japanese on 8 January. Another Japanese army detachment arrived from Mindanao and began to land on Tarakan Island, before proceeding to Sandakan on 17 January. The Japanese arrival was met with no strong resistance, as the protectorate mainly relied on the Royal Navy for defence. Although North Borneo had a police force –the British North Borneo Constabulary– it never had its own army or navy. The British North Borneo Constabulary, had served these functions as the territory's military and marine patrol. However, they were heavily outnumbered by the Japanese, and most of the constabulary's leadership was captured and imprisoned, leading to those not captured becoming spies for the British. By the end of January, North Borneo was completely occupied by the Japanese. It was administered as part of the Empire of Japan, with the officers of the chartered company being allowed to continued administration under Japanese supervision.

The arrival of the Japanese forces to Borneo and the fall of Anglo-Japanese Alliance had already been predicted by revelation through secret telegrams that Japanese ships docked regularly at Jesselton were engaged in espionage. Many of the British and Australian soldiers captured after the fall of Malaya and Singapore were brought to North Borneo and held as prisoners of wars (POWs) in Sandakan camp where they were then forced to march from Sandakan to Ranau. Other POWs were also sent to Batu Lintang camp in neighbouring Sarawak. The occupation drove residents in the coastal areas to the interior in search of food and to escape the brutality of the war period, which led to the creation of several resistance movements; one of the such movement known as the Kinabalu Guerrillas which was led by Albert Kwok and supported by indigenous groups in North Borneo.

As part of the Allied Campaign to retake their possessions in the East, Allied forces deployed to Borneo under the Borneo campaign to liberate the island. The Australian Imperial Force (AIF) played a significant part in the mission, with the force being sent to Tarakan and Labuan islands to secure eastern and western Borneo. The Allied Z Special Unit provided intelligence and other information from the Japanese that facilitated the AIF landings, while US submarines were used to transport Australian commandos to Borneo. Most of the major towns of North Borneo were heavily bombed during this period. The war ended on 15 August 1945 following the Japanese surrender and the administration of North Borneo was undertaken by the British Military Administration (BMA) from September. The company official administration returned to administer the territory but, unable to finance the reconstruction cost after the war, ceded administration of the protectorate to the crown colony government on 15 July 1946.

== Government ==
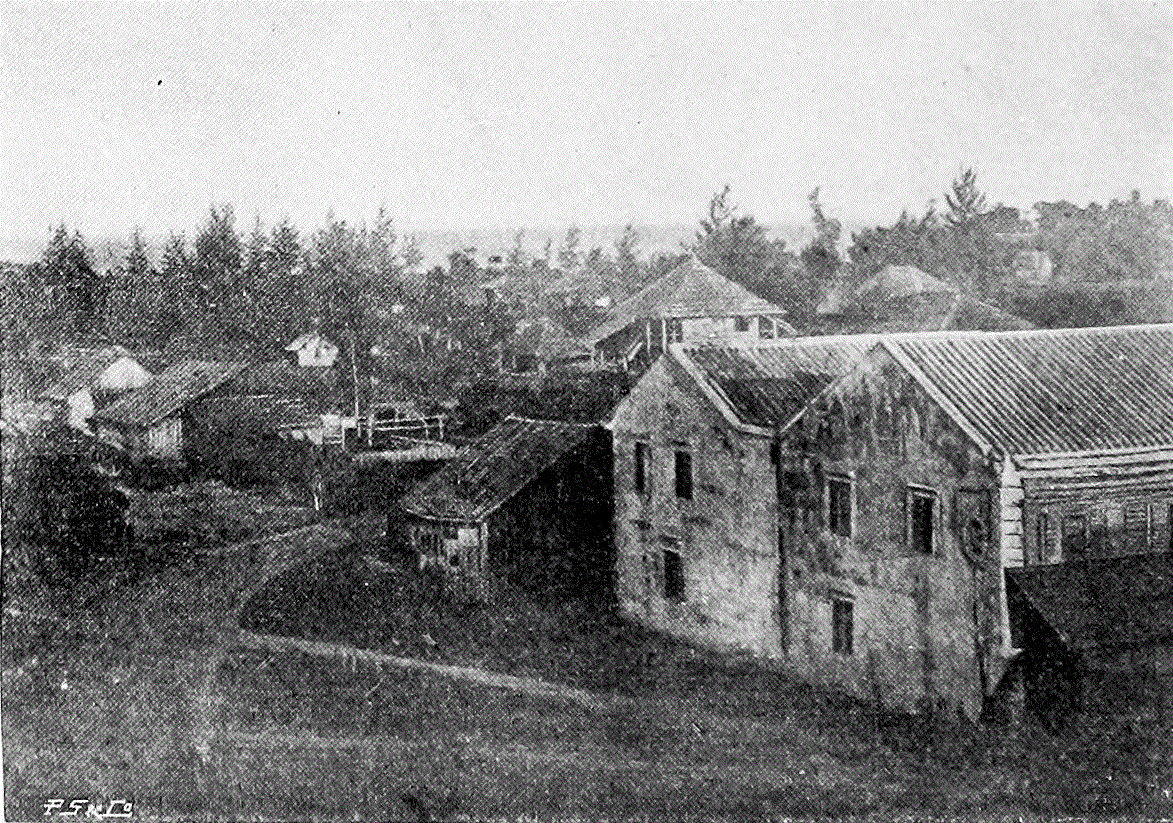
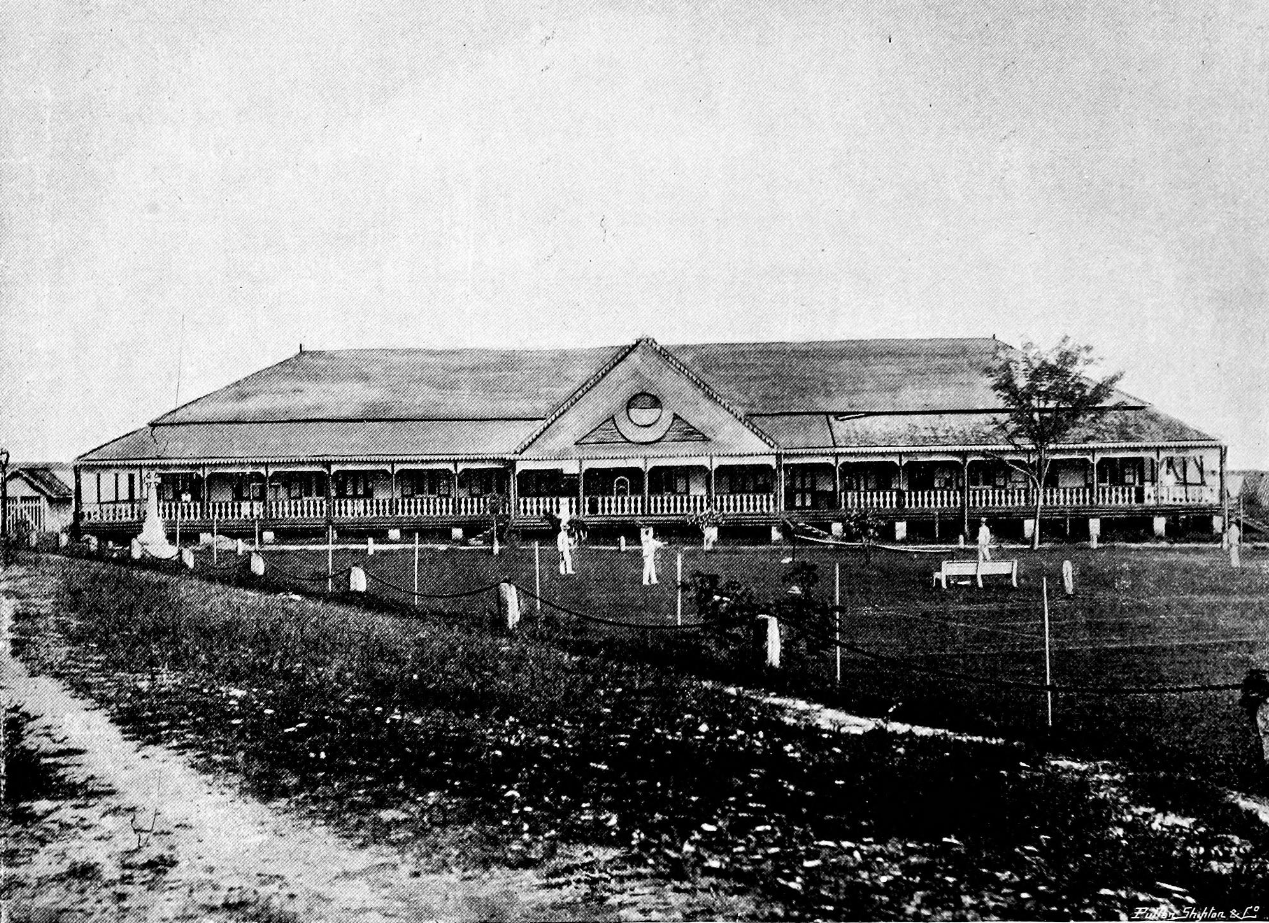
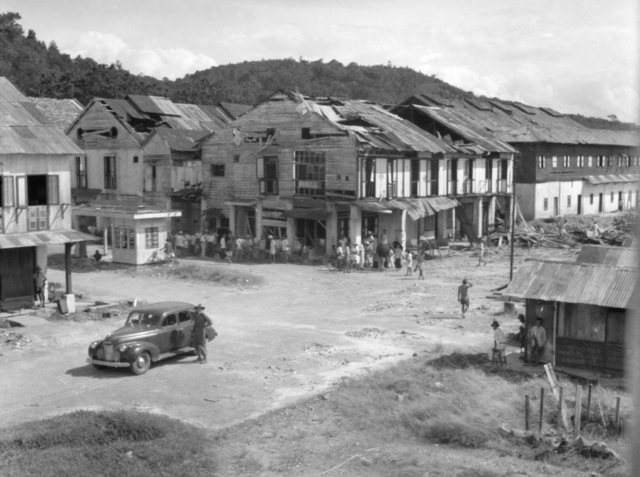
(Top left) 1890 photograph of British government buildings in Kudat, capital of North Borneo from 1881 to 1884
(Top right) 1899 photograph of the British administration building in Sandakan, capital of North Borneo from 1884 to 1945
(Bottom) 1945 photograph of the town centre of Jesselton with partly damaged buildings following the end of World War II, the less destruction caused the capital of North Borneo moved to the area in 1946

The Chartered Company's system of administration was based on standard British colonial empire administrative structure, with the land divided into residencies, managed by government officers known as residents, and sub-divided into districts, managed by district officers. Initially, there were only two residencies: East Coast Residency and West Coast Residency, with residents based at Sandakan and Jesselton respectively. Each residency was divided into provinces, later known as districts. By 1922, there were five residencies to accommodate new areas that were opened up for development. These were the West Coast, Kudat, Tawau, Interior and East Coast Residencies. These residencies were in turn divided into 17 districts. Under this system, British held top posts, while native chiefs managed the people at lower levels. This was not a conscious attempt by the British to instill indirect rule but a convenient arrangement for the district officers who were unfamiliar with local customs and politics. The company administration established a foundation for economic growth in North Borneo by restoring peace to a land where piracy and tribal feuds had grown rampant. It abolished slavery and set up transport, health and education services for the people, and allowed indigenous communities to continue their traditional lifestyles.

The first of the company administration capitals was in Kudat, which was established in 1881. In 1884, the administration was moved to Sandakan. At the early stage of the North Borneo administration foundation, there were no Malays in North Borneo; the closest were the Bruneians, with the coastal inhabitants of both Bajau and Sulus being constant lawbreakers with warlike instincts, and the interior inhabitants, such as the Dusuns, being doubted by the British, which caused them not to be recruited as British security members. Due to this, various nationalities from the British Empire were recruited by the authority: the Somalis, Malays from Labuan and the Straits Settlements, and Dayaks from the neighbouring Raj of Sarawak. The British North Borneo Constabulary, the territory's police force, in 1883 comprised 3 Europeans, 50 Indians (Punjabis and Pashtuns), 30 Dayaks, 50 Somalis and 20 Malays. Constables trained at depot an average of three days per week. In 1884 the force had a total of 176 members, which increased to about 510 over three years. While under the protectorate, international relations were managed by the British government, internally North Borneo was governed by the North Borneo Chartered Company as an independent state with British protection. The treaty signed on 12 May 1888 stipulated:

North Borneo, 1888

Agreement between the British Government and the British North Borneo Company for the establishment of a British Protectorate —Signed at London, 12 May 1888

I. The State of North Borneo comprises the territories specified in the said Royal Charter, and such other territories as the Company have acquired, or may hereafter acquire, ‘under the provisions of Article XV of the said Charter.
It is divided into nine Provinces, namely:

Province Alcock;
Province Cunliffe;
Province Dent;
Province Dewhurst;
Province Elphinstone;
Province Keppel;
Province Martin;
Province Mayne;
Province Myburgh.

II. The State of North Borneo shall continue to be governed and administered as an independent State by the company in conformity with the provisions of the said Charter; under the protection of Great Britain; but such protection shall confer no right on Her Majesty's Government to interfere with the internal administration of the State further than is provided herein or by the Charter of the Company.
III. The relations between the State of North Borneo and all foreign States, including the States of Brunei and of Sarawak, shall be conducted by Her Majesty's Government, or in accordance with its directions; and if any difference should arise between the Government of North Borneo and that of any other State, the Company, as representing the State of North Borneo, agrees to abide by the decision of Her Majesty's Government, and to take all necessary to give effect thereto.
IV. Her Majesty's Government shall have the right to establish British Consular officers in any part of the said territories, who shall receive exequaturs in the name of the Government of North Borneo. They shall enjoy whatever privileges are usually granted to Consular officers, and they shall be entitled to hoist the British flag over their residences and public offices.
V. British subjects, commerce, and shipping shall enjoy the same right, privileges, and advantages as the subjects, commerce, and shipping of the most favoured nation, as well as any other rights, privileges, and advantages which may be enjoyed by the subjects, commerce and shipping of North Borneo.
VI. No cession or other alienation of any part of the territory of the State of North Borneo shall be made by its Government to any foreign State, or the subjects or the citizens thereof, without the consent of Her Majesty's Government; but this restriction shall not apply to ordinary grants or leases of lands or houses to private individuals for purposes of residence, agriculture, commerce, or other business.

=== Indigenous law and land rights ===
Administration of North Borneo

Governor
Secretary General
Other Departments	Attorney General	Finance Secretary
Department Heads	Resident	General Finance
District Offices	District Officer	District Courts
Assistant District Officer
Native Chief	Native Courts and Administration
Village Chief

The indigenous people of northern Borneo had their own unique ancestral and historical property rights, which traced their origin from their traditional religions that are protected by Adats based on customary practices. The arrival of the British, and the subsequent formation of the British North Borneo Chartered Company with Western land law, further recognised and gazetted these customary laws within the law of British North Borneo, which continue to influence land rights law in the territory through the Native Court, though these also sometimes conflict with state-backed resource extraction. When the company began to institute law over the territory of North Borneo following its acquisition, European government officials realised the need to recognise the importance of Native Customary Laws (NCL) in the daily lives of the indigenous people. The British administration subsequently incorporated this into Article 9 of the royal charter granted by the British government to the company on 1 November 1881. The article stated that:

In the administration of justice by the company to the people of Borneo, or to any of the inhabitants thereof, careful regard shall always be had to the customs and laws of the class or tribe or nation to which the parties respectively belong, especially with respect to the holding, possession, transfer and disposition of land and goods, and testate or interstate succession thereto, and marriage, divorce and legitimacy, and other rights of property and personal rights.

Another indigenous system for conservation, the tagal is a traditional indigenous natural resource management practice that was recognised by the company administration, which was originally developed and practised by the indigenous Kadazan, Dusun, and Murut people to sustainably manage freshwater fisheries in rivers. The system is designated through "no-take" zones or periods in rivers, with tagal carrying the meaning "to prohibit" in both the Coastal Kadazan and Dusunic languages, where it was enforced through community consensus and native customary laws (Adat), with local committees (known as the Bombon committees) managing the areas and issuing penalties to those who violated the rules, be they from the indigenous or outsiders.

== Economy ==
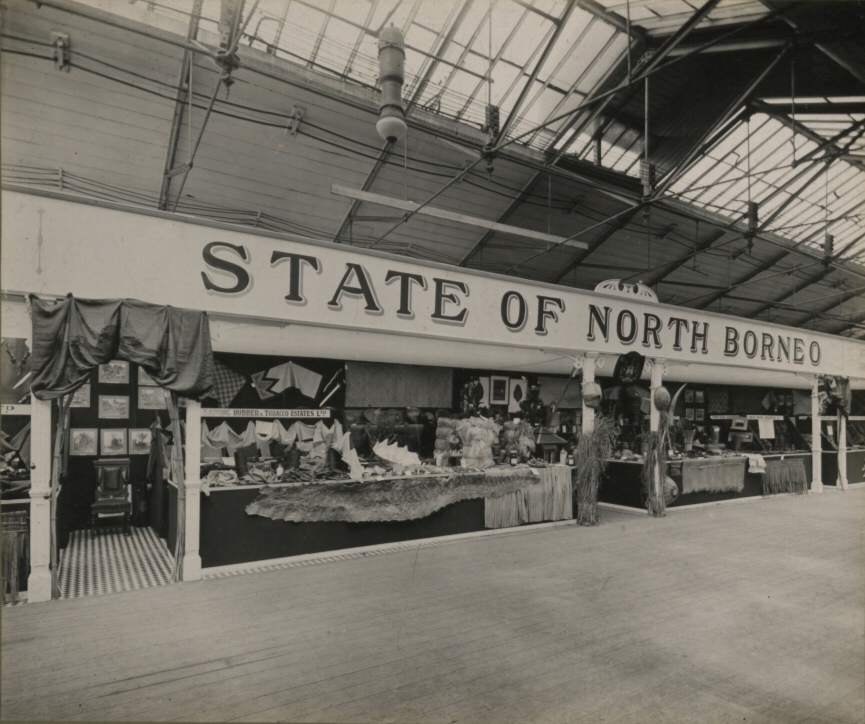
North Borneo booth at the 1921 Industries Exhibition, London

North Borneo was identified by the British as resource-rich in minerals and varied, with its extent not fully known at the time nor able to be ascertained, which will only be known with further explorations. With the beginning of planned economic activities under British administration, the North Borneo authorities began to open land for agriculture, and native land rights began to be formed. The government however felt that the native population was too small and unsuited to meet the requirements of modern development, so they began to sponsor various schemes for the migration of Chinese workers from Hong Kong and China. Furthermore, the British colonial administration policy at the time imposed strict rules regarding indigenous participation in the economy, urging the natives to concentrate on their own economic endeavours. In 1882, the North Borneo authorities appointed Walter Henry Medhurst as Commissioner for Chinese Immigration with the mission of attracting more businessmen to invest in North Borneo by providing a workforce. Medhurst's efforts were costly and unsuccessful; however, the Hakka, not part of the plan, began to migrate to North Borneo where they formed an agricultural community. This was followed by the migration of both the Buginese and Javanese from the neighbouring Dutch East Indies, facilitated by both the British and Dutch, to various fields in North Borneo, especially in the opening of new British settlement areas.

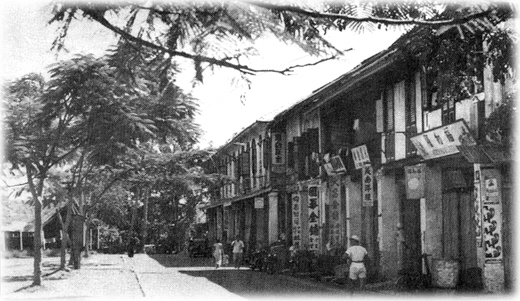
Bond Street in Jesselton with Chinese shoplots, c. 1930

In 1882, North Borneo gained a total of $714,162 in total trade, increasing from $617,101 in 1881. Subdivided through both the west coast and east coast, with the western area receiving a total of $311,000 and the eastern area at $403,162. A year before, the eastern gains were less at $306,101, while the western were at $311,000. The total exports were $145,443.55 in 1881 before increasing to over $387,757.88 in 1885, while imports stood at $160,658.39 in 1881 before increasing to $626,776.34. The most principal products North Borneo produces include bark, beeswax, edible bird's nests, coconuts, camphor, copra, damar (Dipterocarpaceae), salted fishes (clams and oysters), various fruits, gutta-percha, rubber, pearls, pepper, rattan, paddy rice, sago, sharks' fins, tortoises and various wood products. Since the 18th century, tobacco was North Borneo's foremost planting industry. The logging history in North Borneo can be traced since the 1870s. From 1890s, hardwood exports increased, with logging expanding during the interwar period.

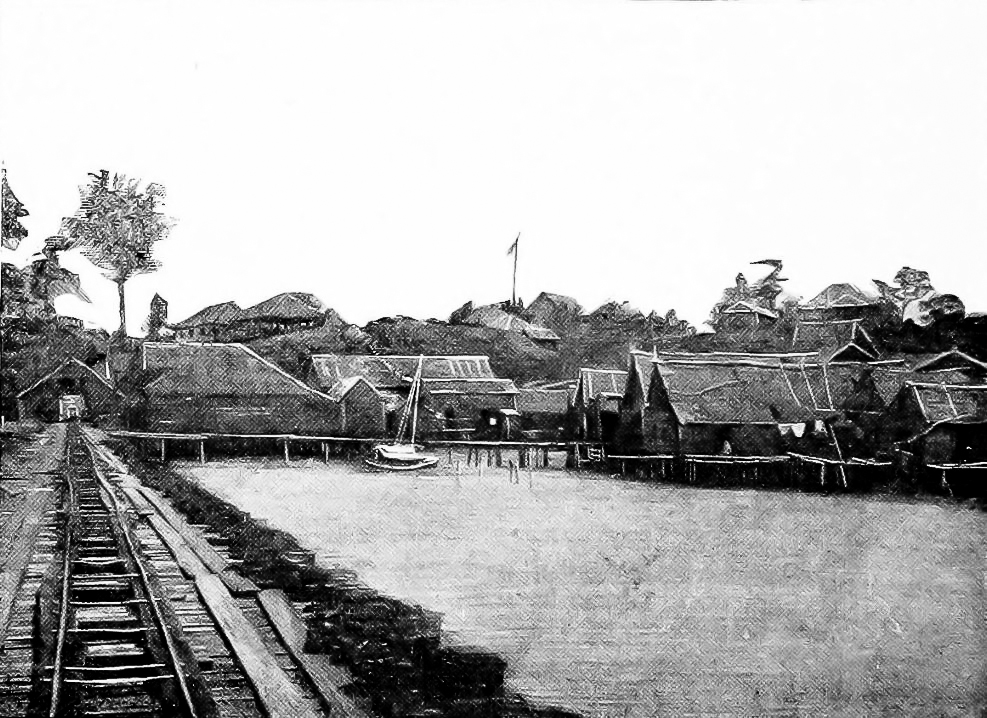
Tobacco estate in Lahad Datu, 1899

The total revenue in 1881 was $20,207.81 before reaching $110,443.00 through an 1885 estimate, while total expenditure reached $108,294.97 in 1881 and increased to over $202,075.00 in the 1885 estimate. In the 1900s, North Borneo joined the rubber boom. The completion of North Borneo Railway Line helped to transport the resources to a major port on the west coast. By 1915, around 34,828 acres (14,094 ha) of land, in addition to Chinese and North Borneo smallholdings, had been planted with rubber tree. In the same year, the Governor of North Borneo, Aylmer Cavendish Pearson invited Japanese emigrants to participate in the economic activities there. The Japanese government received the request warmly and sent researchers to discover potential economic opportunities. At the early stage, the Japanese encouraged their farmers to go to North Borneo to cultivate rice, as their country depended on rice imports. With increasing economic interest from the Japanese, they purchased a rubber estate owned by the North Borneo government. By 1937, North Borneo exported 178,000 cubic metres of timber, surpassing Siam, which exporting 85,000 cubic metres of timber. Many of the privately owned Japanese estates and companies had been involved in the economic sectors of North Borneo since being invited by the British. With the increasing numbers of Japanese investments, many Japanese also migrated with their family to the east coast of North Borneo, primarily to Tawau and Kunak.

=== Currency ===
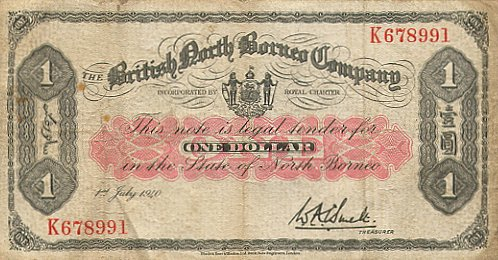
One North Borneo dollar, 1940

The original monetary unit of North Borneo was the Mexican dollar. The dollar was later matched to the Straits dollar and rated at 9 Straits dollars (equal to 5 US dollars at the time). The parity with the Straits dollar was made on 2 January 1914 through Ordinance 3 of 1914, which prohibits the importation of silver dollars, other than Straits Settlements dollars, if the value is $25 or over. Different notes were issued throughout the administration, with backgrounds featuring the Mount Kinabalu or the company arms. A total of seven banknote issues were released from 1886 to 1940.

== Society ==
=== Demography ===
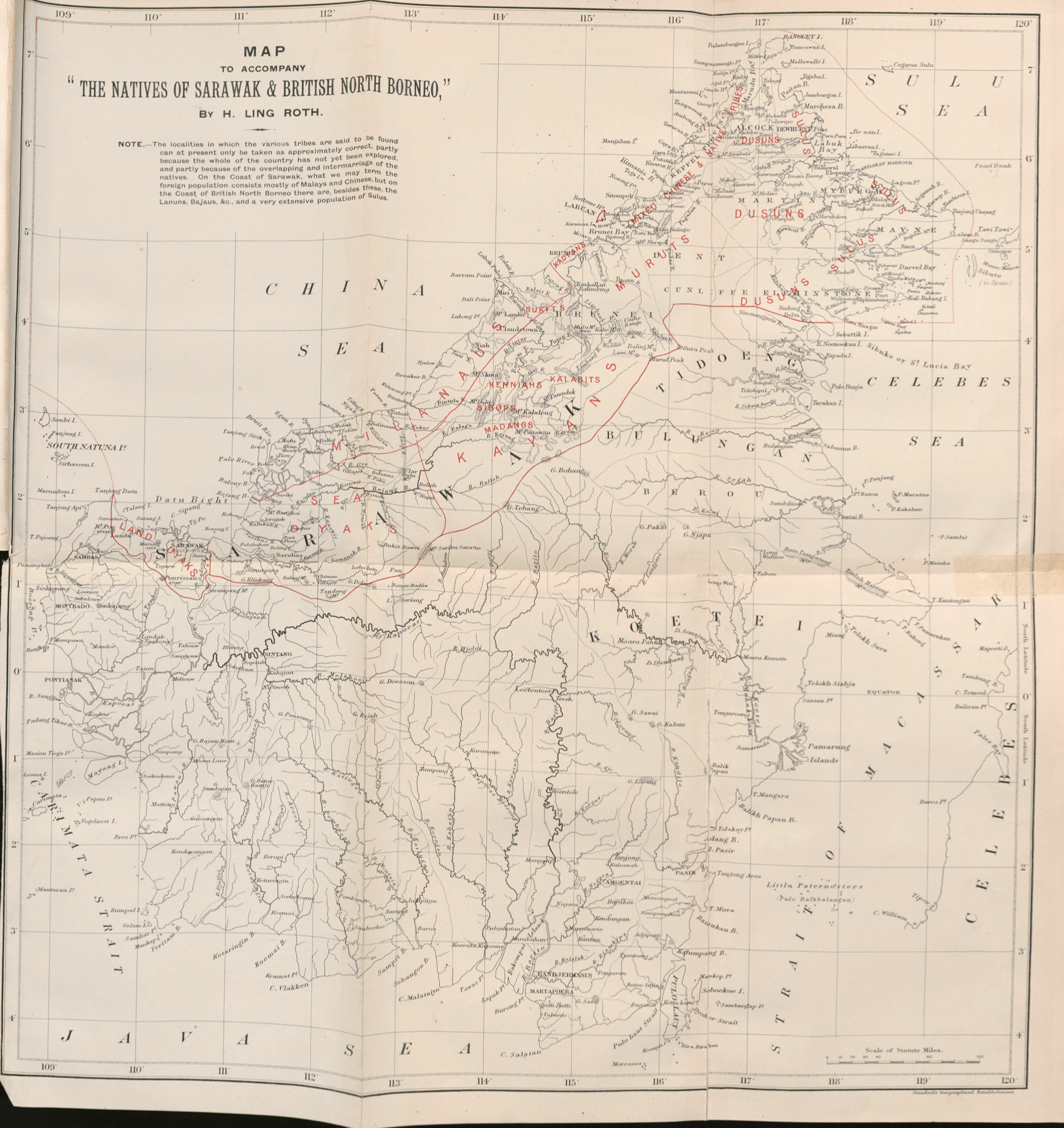
Ethnic composition map of the natives of North Borneo and the neighbouring Raj of Sarawak, 1896

In 1881, 60,000 to 100,000 indigenous people lived in North Borneo. The people on the coast were mainly Muslims, with the Christian and animist-pagan aborigines mostly located inland. The Kadazan, Dusun, Murut, Rungus, Lundayeh, and Paitan were the largest indigenous group in the interior, while Bajau, Bisaya, Bruneian, Illanun, Kedayan, Suluk, and Tidung dominated the coastal areas. Following various immigration schemes initiated by the British, such as the Chinese, Japanese, as well as the Cocos Malays resettlement scheme, the population increased to 200,000 in 1920, 257,804 in 1930, 285,000 in 1935, and 331,000 in 1945. Under company rule, the government of North Borneo not only recruited Chinese workers but also Japanese immigrants to overcome the shortage of manpower in the economic sectors.

From 1911 until 1951, the total of Chinese population increased from only 27,801 to 74,374 which is divided between Hakka (44,505), Cantonese (11,833), Hokkien (7,336), Teochew (3,948), some Hailam (Hainan) (3,571) and other Chinese groups (3,181). The Bugis people, primarily known as seafarers and traders from neighbouring Dutch Celebes Island, established early settlements in the Tawau region around the 1880s, playing a significant role in developing North Borneo's economy, particularly in agriculture and trade, with a notable settlement founded in Old Tawau. Their migration intensified in the late 19th and early 20th centuries, with settlers arriving from South Sulawesi working in the agricultural, timber, and fishing sectors of the British company rule, centred largely around the Tawau region and nearby east coast, where they subsequently became a major, influential ethnic group within the area. The Javanese are another economic contributor towards North Borneo development from its early foundation until 1932. Originating from the Dutch-administered Java island, the British, with co-operation with the Dutch, facilitated the movement of Javanese workers to various fields in British North Borneo, especially in the opening of new British settlement areas. Other ethnic groups originated from the Dutch East Indies, including the Banjarese from South Kalimantan as well as Butonese and Lamaholot from the areas surrounding the Lesser Sunda Islands.

The South Asian population, such as Sikhs, were mostly brought throughout the administration of British North Borneo, where they served under the British North Borneo Police Force (NBPF) to maintain the security of the state.

=== Communications infrastructure ===
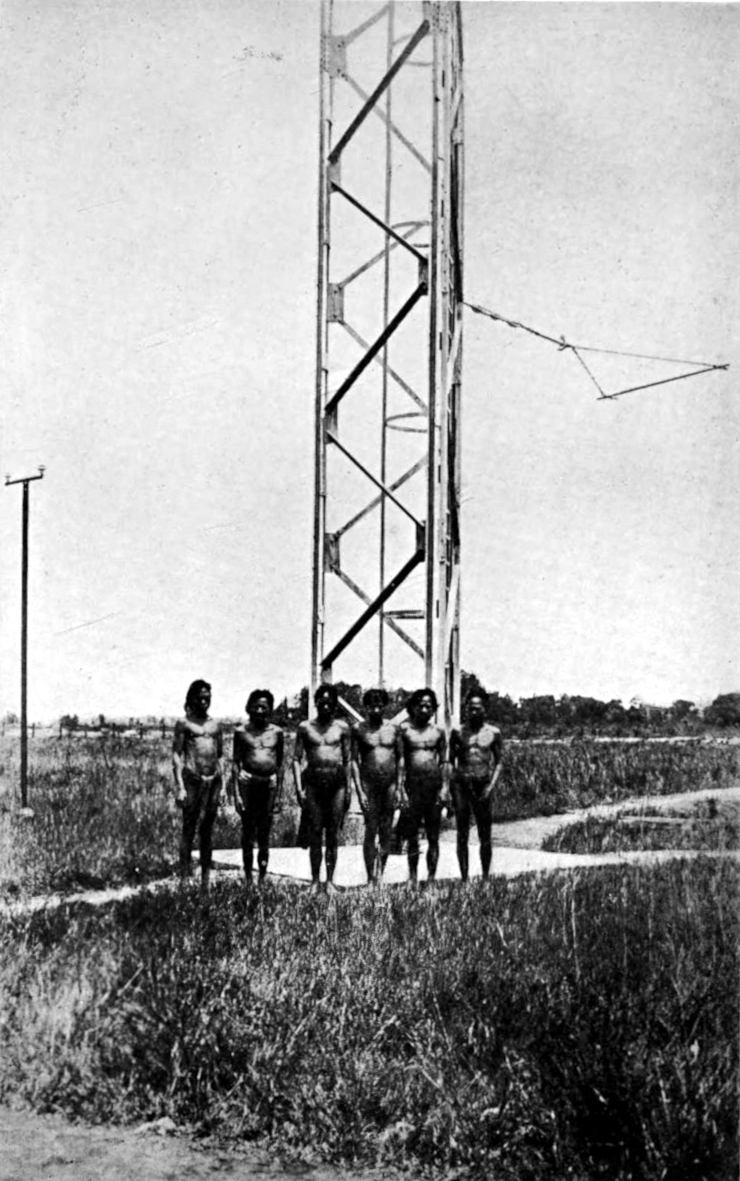
A group of Murut men standing next to the Jesselton Wireless Station.

North Borneo was connected to the Singapore-Hong Kong submarine cable by a link from the island of Labuan to Menumbok. The first message from the Borneo mainland to London was sent on 19 May 1894. A few days later, the work on a telegraph line from the West Coast to Sandakan was started. It took three years and exacted a heavy toll in human life to push the line through the almost uninhabited interior territory covered by dense forest until, on 7 April 1897, a congratulatory message from the governor in Sandakan for transmission to the Court of Directors in London was successfully transmitted from Sandakan to Labuan. In the early 1910s the technical and financial problems with the telegraph line prompted the company to venture into the construction of a wireless network, based on the quenched spark system of the German Telefunken Company (also known as Siemens quenched spark system) with the first stage of this network comprised stations in Sandakan, Jesselton, Tawau, and Kudat. The first wireless communication was established on 24 October 1913 between British North Borneo and Jolo on the Philippine Islands. Inland communication was effected on 14 January 1914 between Sandakan and Jesselton. On 2 January 1919, C. F. Newton Wade was appointed as the Superintendent of the Wireless, while on 2 June 1919, Mr H. A. Dabell was appointed as the Assistant Superintendent of Wireless, both through announcements in the North Borneo Gazette.

=== Rail services ===
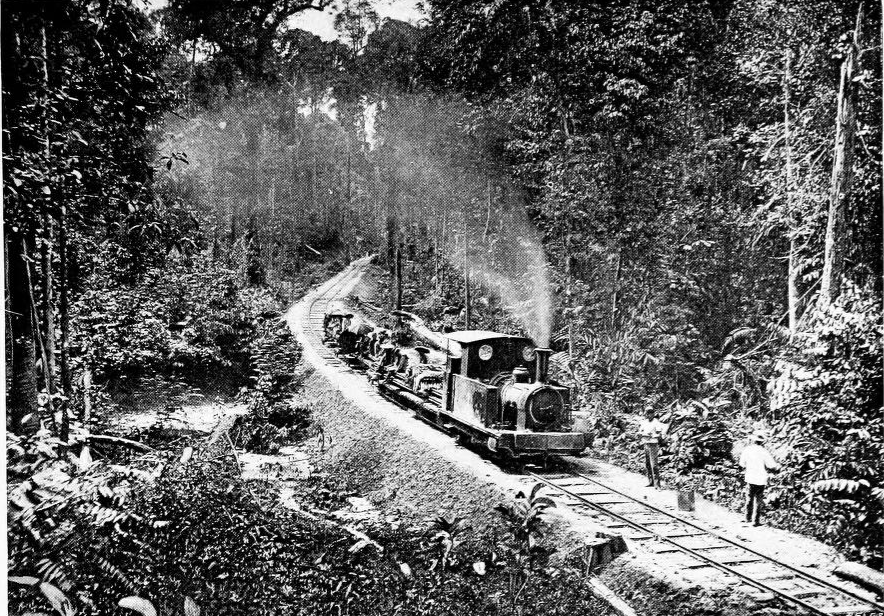
The opening of the North Borneo Railway Line on 3 February 1898 to transport commodity in the west coast area

William Cowie was primarily responsible in bringing rail transport to Sabah, and he appointed Arthur Joseph West to become North Borneo's first railway superintendent. Construction of the first lines of track began in 1896 at Brunei Bay between Sipitang and Tawau, which opened on 3 February 1898. West supervised the construction of three lines; Weston–Beaufort (completed 1900), Beaufort–Jesselton (completed 1902), and Beaufort–Tenom (completed 1905), which in 1907 was expanded to Melalap.

The North Borneo Railway opened to the public on 1 August 1914 as the main transportation facility for west coast.

=== Marine and riverine transportation ===
The Company relied heavily on the establishment of trade networks between locals and government officials at Padas River, Papar River, and Tempasuk River. Coastal ships, known as coasters, had for hundreds of years operated between the mouths of the large navigable rivers where the indigenous population had grown its "peasant economy," trading food and goods grown in the inland areas with the coastal communities and neighboring islands.

When the Chartered Company was established, Dent was opposed to the notion of establishing a Company steamship line. He reached-out to other steamship companies operating routes between Singapore and Hong Kong (Sabah was roughly halfway between the two). The Sarawak Steamship Company soon began trips between Sarawak, Brunei, and North Borneo.

When the tobacco industry started growing heavily, Dent secured a contract with the Benh Meyer and Company, agents for the German company Norddeutscher Lloyd in Singapore. The Company had secured six steamship contracts to British Singapore, and two lines to British Hong Kong. Small steamship lines were also established between major coastal communities. However, with World War I, the German company was no longer viable.

The Straits Steamship Company then began operating regular passages from Singapore. The Sabah Steamship Company was established by the Straits Steamship Company in 1927 with weekly and fortnightly schedules for certain lines. By the 1950's, the Straits Steamship Company operated six ships along the coast of North Borneo.

=== Municipal services ===
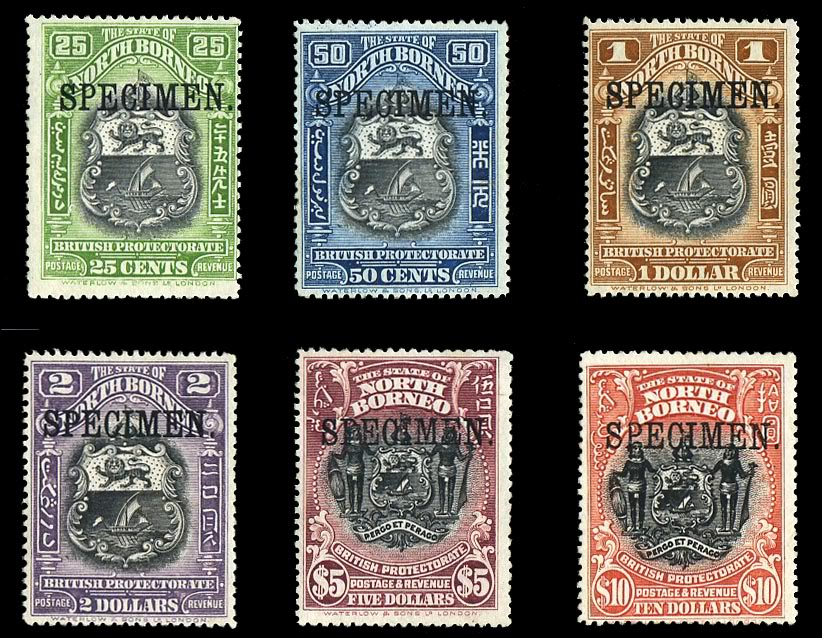
1911 specimen stamps of North Borneo

Postal service was also available throughout the administration.

=== Media ===
The Journal of the Royal Asiatic Society (since 1820), The London Gazette (since 1881), and British North Borneo Herald (since 1883) held a significant amount of records regarding North Borneo before and during the British administration.

After the establishment of the Crown Colony, the government produced Colonial Reports on an annual basis, also known as the Annual Report of British North Borneo, printed at the North Borneo Printing Office and Her Majesty's Stationery Office.

== See also ==
- History of Sabah
- Postage stamps and postal history of North Borneo
- Postal orders of British North Borneo
