= High court (Malaysia) =

High Court of Malaya/ High Court of Sabah and Sarawak
- Mahkamah Tinggi Malaya/ Mahkamah Tinggi Sabah dan Sarawak
- Established: 1957
- Composition method: Royal appointment with the advice of the Prime Minister
- Authorised by: Federal Constitution
- Appeals to: Court of Appeals of Malaysia
- Judge term length: Compulsory retirement at age 66
- Number of positions: Peninsular Malaysia: 60 (including 16 vacancies); Sabah and Sarawak: 13 (including 5 vacancies)
- Website: www.kehakiman.gov.my

Chief Judge of the High Court of Malaya
- Currently: Hashim Hamzah
- Since: 3 December 2025

Chief Judge of the High Court of Sabah and Sarawak
- Currently: Azizah Nawawi
- Since: 28 July 2025

The high courts in Malaysia are the third-highest courts in the hierarchy of courts, after the Federal Court and the Court of Appeal. Article 121 of the Constitution of Malaysia provides that there shall be two high courts of co-ordinate jurisdiction—the High Court in Malaya and the High Court in Sabah and Sarawak (before 1994, the High Court in Borneo). Before 1969, the High Court in Singapore was also part of the Malaysian courts system (see Law of Singapore).

The High Court in Malaya has its principal registry in Kuala Lumpur, with other registries to be found in all states in Peninsular Malaysia, while the High Court in Sabah and Sarawak has its principal registry in Kuching, with other registries elsewhere in Sabah and Sarawak. There are in total 22 high court registries across all 13 states in Malaysia. The two High Courts also travel on circuit to other smaller towns.

The two high courts, the Court of Appeal and the Federal Court are classified as superior courts, while the magistrates' courts and the sessions courts are classified as the subordinate courts. The high courts function both as a court of original jurisdiction as well as an appellate court, and are each headed by a chief judge (before 1994, chief justice). The chief judges of Malaya and Sabah and Sarawak are the third and fourth highest positions in Malaysian judiciary after the Chief Justice of the Federal Court (before 1994, the Lord President of the Supreme Court) and the President of the Court of Appeal.

== High court registries in Malaysia ==
All high court registries and the subordinate courts found in Peninsular Malaysia including the courts in the Federal Territories of Kuala Lumpur and Putrajaya are under the jurisdiction of the High Court in Malaya. Similarly, all courts found in East Malaysia are under the jurisdiction of the High Court in Sabah and Sarawak including the courts in the Federal Territory of Labuan.

Locations of High Courts in Malaysia

== List of chief justices and chief judges ==
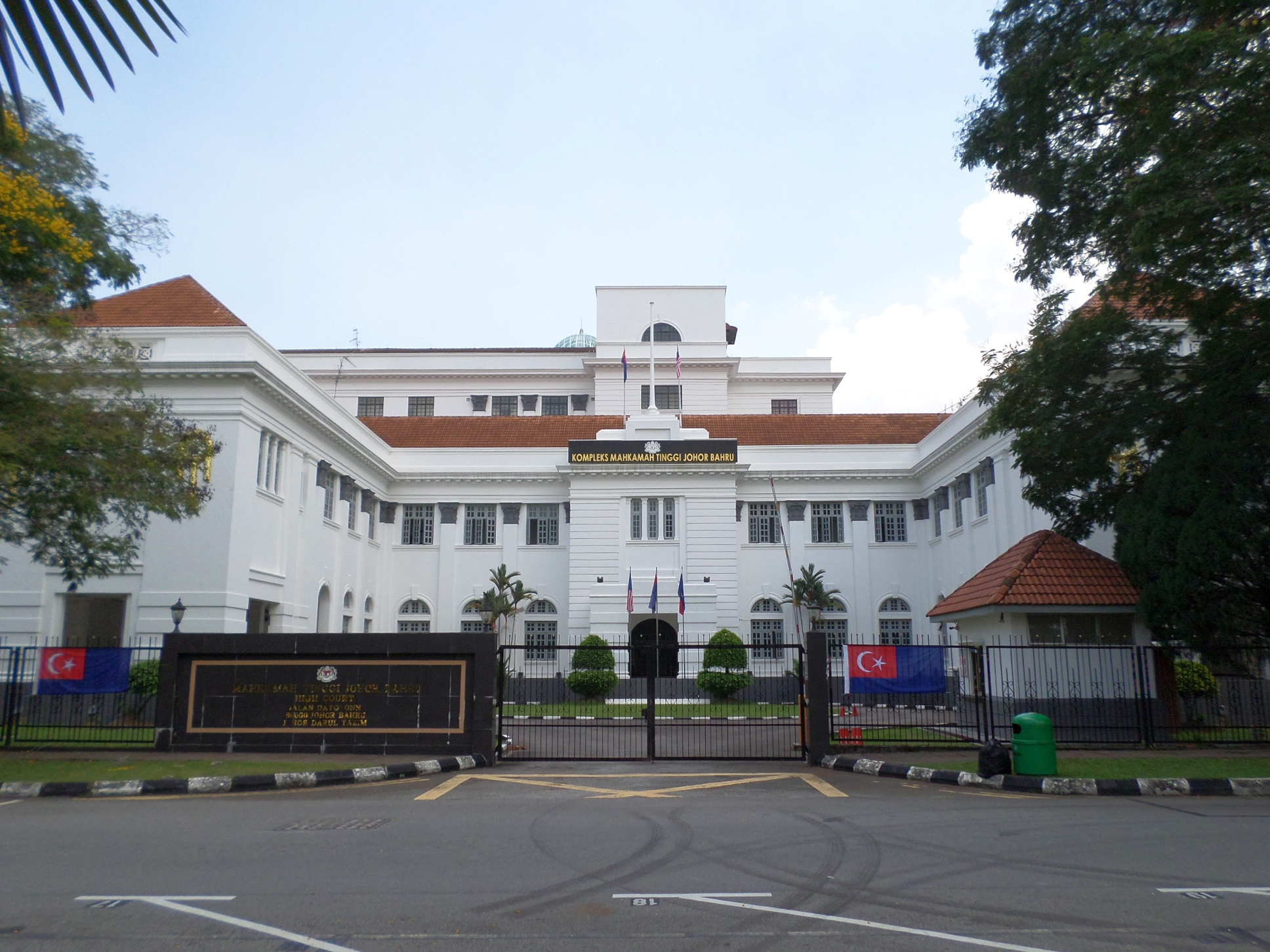
Johor Bahru High Court

=== Malaya and Malaysia (on the federation level) ===
==== Chief Justice of the Supreme Court of Malayan Union (1946 – 1948) ====
- 1946–1948: Sir Harold Curwen Willan

==== Chief Justice of the Federation of Malaya (1948 – 1957) ====
- 1948–1950: Harold Curwen Willan
- 1950–1951: Sir Stafford Foster-Sutton
- 1951–1956: Sir Charles Mathew

==== Chief Justice of the Federation of Malaya (1957 – 1963) ====
- 1957–1963: Tun Sir James Thomson

==== Lord President of the Federal Court (1963 – 1985) ====
- 1963–1966: Tun Sir James Thomson
- 1966–1968: Tun Syed Sheh Hassan Barakbah
- 1966–1974: Tun Azmi Mohamed
- 1974–1982: Tun Mohamed Suffian Mohamed Hashim
- 1982–1984: Raja Tun Azlan Shah
- 1984–1985: Tun Salleh Abas

==== Lord President of the Supreme Court (1985 – 1994) ====
- 1985–1989: Tun Salleh Abas
- 1989–1994: Tun Abdul Hamid Omar

=== States of Malaya (since 1963) ===
==== Chief Justice of Malaya (1963 – 1994, after which the designation was changed to Chief Judge of Malaya) ====
- 1963–1966: Syed Sheh Barakbah
- 1966–1968: Azmi Mohamed
- 1968–1973: Ong Hock Thye
- 1973–1974: Mohamed Suffian Mohamed Hashim
- 1974–1979: Sarwan Singh Gill
- 1979–1982: Raja Azlan Shah (later 34th Sultan of Perak and 9th Yang di-Pertuan Agong of Malaysia)
- 1982–1984: Salleh Abas
- 1984–1989: Abdul Hamid Omar
- 1989–1992: Hashim Yeop Sani
- 1992–1994: Gunn Chit Tuan

Some modern texts will refer to them as Chief Judges.

==== Chief Judge of Malaya (since 1994) ====
- 1994: Mohamed Eusoff Chin
- 1994–1997: Anuar Zainal Abidin
- 1997–2000: Wan Adnan Ismail
- 2000–2002: Ahmad Fairuz Abdul Halim
- 2002–2004: Haidar Mohamed Noor
- 2004–2006: Siti Norma Yaakob
- 2007–2008: Alauddin Sheriff
- 2008–2011: Arifin Zakaria
- 2011–2017: Zulkefli Ahmad Makinudin
- 2017–2018: Ahmad Maarop
- 2018–2019: Zaharah Ibrahim
- 2019–2022: Azahar Mohamed
- 2023–2024: Mohamad Zabidin Mohd Diah
- 2024–2025: Hasnah Mohammed Hashim
- 2025–present: Hashim Hamzah

=== Borneo (North Borneo (Sabah) and Sarawak) ===
North Borneo			Sarawak		
Office	Justice	Tenure	Office	Justice	Tenure
Chief Justice of North Borneo (until 1951)	Charles Frederick Cunningham Macaskie CMG	1934 to 1941	Chief Justice of Sarawak (1930-1951)	Thomas Jamieson Laycock Stirling Boyd	1930 to 1939
Chief Justice of North Borneo (until 1951)	Charles Frederick Cunningham Macaskie CMG	1934 to 1941	Chief Justice of Sarawak (1930-1951)	H. Thackwell-Lewis	1939 to 1945
Chief Justice of North Borneo (until 1951)	Japanese occupation	1942 to 1945	Chief Justice of Sarawak (1930-1951)	Japanese occupation	1942 to 1945
Chief Justice of North Borneo (until 1951)	Sir Ivor Llewellyn Brace	1945 to 1951	Chief Justice of Sarawak (1930-1951)	Robert Yorke Hedges	1946 to 1951
Sarawak, North Borneo and Brunei
Office	Title	Justice		Tenure	
Chief Justice of the Combined Judiciary of Sarawak, North Borneo and Brunei (1951–1963)	Sir	Ivor Llewellyn Brace		1 December 1951 – 24 October 1952	
Chief Justice of the Combined Judiciary of Sarawak, North Borneo and Brunei (1951–1963)	Sir	Ernest Hillas Williams JP		c. 1957	
Chief Justice of the Combined Judiciary of Sarawak, North Borneo and Brunei (1951–1963)	Sir	John Ainley MC		5 December 1959 – 1 January 1963	
Chief Justice of the Combined Judiciary of Sarawak, North Borneo and Brunei (1951–1963)	Sir	William Campbell Wylie QC		2 January 1963 – 15 September 1963	
Sabah and Sarawak
Office	Title	Justice		Tenure	
Chief Justice of Borneo (1963–1994)	Sir	William Campbell Wylie QC		16 September 1963 – 27 August 1965	
Chief Justice of Borneo (1963–1994)	Sir Tan Sri	Philip Ernest Housden Pike QC		11 September 1965 – 27 August 1968	
Chief Justice of Borneo (1963–1994)	Tan Sri Dato'	Ismail Khan Ibrahim Khan		2 September 1968 – 31 December 1973	
Chief Justice of Borneo (1963–1994)	Tan Sri Datuk Amar	Lee Hun Hoe		1 January 1974 – 31 December 1988	
Chief Justice of Borneo (1963–1994)	Tan Sri Datuk Amar	Mohamad Jemuri Serjan		11 March 1989 – 23 June 1994	
Office	Title	Justice		Tenure	
Chief Judge of Sabah and Sarawak (since 1994)	Tan Sri Datuk Amar	Mohamad Jemuri Serjan		24 June 1994 – 9 September 1994	
Chief Judge of Sabah and Sarawak (since 1994)	Tan Sri Datuk Amar	Chong Siew Fai		16 June 1995 – 3 July 2000	
Chief Judge of Sabah and Sarawak (since 1994)	Tan Sri Datuk Amar	Steve Shim Lip Kiong		2 July 2000 – 25 July 2006	
Chief Judge of Sabah and Sarawak (since 1994)	Tan Sri Datuk Seri Panglima	Richard Malanjum		26 July 2006 – 11 July 2018	
Chief Judge of Sabah and Sarawak (since 1994)	Tan Sri Datuk Seri Panglima	David Wong Dak Wah		11 July 2018 – 19 February 2020	
Chief Judge of Sabah and Sarawak (since 1994)	Tan Sri Datuk Amar	Abang Iskandar Abang Hashim		25 February 2020 – 17 January 2023	
Chief Judge of Sabah and Sarawak (since 1994)	Dato'	Abdul Rahman Sebli		17 January 2023 – 25 July 2025	
Chief Judge of Sabah and Sarawak (since 1994)		Azizah Nawawi		28 July 2025 – Incumbent	

=== Singapore ===
Office	Title	Justice	Tenure
Chief Justice of Singapore (1963–1969 (as part of Malaysia, 1963–1965))	Tan Sri	Wee Chong Jin	1963 to 1969

== See also ==
- Chief Justice of the Straits Settlements
- Federal Court of Malaysia
- Malaysian Court of Appeal
- Judiciary of Malaysia
- Lord President of the Federal Court
- Chief Justice of Malaysia
- President of the Court of Appeal of Malaysia
- Chief Judge of Sabah and Sarawak
- 1Malaysia Development Berhad scandal
