= Chief Judge of Sabah and Sarawak =

Head of the High Court of Sabah and Sarawak

- Hakim Besar Sabah dan Sarawak حاكيم بسر سابه دان سراوق
- Incumbent; Azizah Nawawi since 28 July 2025
- High Court of Sabah and Sarawak
- Style: Yang Amat Arif The Right Honourable The Very Wise His Lordship
- Member of: Federal Court of Malaysia
- Seat: Palace of Justice, Putrajaya
- Nominator: Prime Minister of Malaysia
- Appointer: Yang di-Pertuan Agong on the recommendation and advice of the Prime Minister
- Term length: mandatory retirement age at 65 or 66 (at request for minimal extension), extension retirement age at 68 or 70
- Constituting instrument: Federal Constitution of Malaysia
- Inaugural holder: Thomas Jamieson Laycock Stirling Boyd as Chief Justice of Sarawak (1930); Charles Frederick Cunningham Macaskie CMG as Chief Justice of North Borneo (1934); Sir Ivor Llewellyn Brace as Chief Justice of Combined Judiciary of Sarawak, North Borneo and Brunei (1951); Sir William Campbell Wylie ED QC as Chief Justice of Borneo (1963); Mohamad Jemuri Serjan as Chief Judge of Sabah and Sarawak (1994)
- Formation: 24 June 1994
- Salary: RM30,000 monthly
- Website: www.kehakiman.gov.my

The chief judge of Sabah and Sarawak (Malay: Hakim Besar Sabah dan Sarawak; Jawi: حاكيم بسر سابه دان سراوق), formerly the chief justice of Borneo, is the office and title of the head of the High Court of Sabah and Sarawak. The title has been in use since 24 June 1994, when the High Court of Sabah and Sarawak was renamed from the High Court of Borneo.

The High Court of Sabah and Sarawak is the third highest court of Malaysia alongside the High Court in Malaya. As such, the chief judge of Sabah and Sarawak is the fourth highest position in Malaysian judicial system after the Chief Justice of Malaysia, President of the Court of Appeal of Malaysia and the Chief Judge of Malaya.

== Constitutional basis ==
The office of Chief Judge of the High Court of Sabah and Sarawak is established under Article 122 of the Constitution of Malaysia, which establishes the then-Supreme Court (now Federal Court) as consisting of a Lord President (now Chief Justice), the chief judges of the High Courts of Malaya together with that of Sabah and Sarawak and at least four other judges and such additional judges as may be appointed pursuant to Clause (1A).

== Role ==
The chief judge is first among equals among the judges of the High Court of Sabah and Sarawak, and the position differs little from that of the other judges. All judges, including the chief judge, are appointed by the Yang di-Pertuan Agong (King of Malaysia), on the advice of the Prime Minister of Malaysia. Under Article 125 of the Malaysian Constitution, they can be removed only by the Yang di-Pertuan Agong, on a recommendation from a tribunal consisting of at least five judges who are current or former Federal Court judges. Reasons for removal include the chief judge:

- not following the Judges’ Code of Ethics; or
- being physically or mentally unable to carry out his or her duties.

The prime minister will then provide the Yang di-Pertuan Agong the reason(s) why the chief judge should be removed. The Yang di-Pertuan Agong will then proceed to set up the tribunal to make a decision.

== List of chief justices and chief judges ==
=== Sarawak (1930 to 1951) ===
Name	Born	Alma mater	Tenure started	Tenure ended	Duration
The Right Honourable; Thomas Jamieson Laycock Stirling Boyd	23 October 1886 (died 1 January 1973 (aged 86))	Trinity College, Oxford	1930	1939	8–9 years
The Right Honourable; H. Thackwell-Lewis	? (died ?)	?	1939	1945	5–6 years
Japanese occupation of Sarawak (December 1941–September 1945)
The Right Honourable; Robert Yorke Hedges	6 August 1903 (died 29 May 1963 (aged 59))	Victoria University of Manchester	1946	1951	4–5 years
The Right Honourable; Robert Yorke Hedges	6 August 1903 (died 29 May 1963 (aged 59))	Harvard University	1946	1951	4–5 years
The Right Honourable; Robert Yorke Hedges	6 August 1903 (died 29 May 1963 (aged 59))	Gray's Inn	1946	1951	4–5 years

=== North Borneo (1934 to 1951) ===
Name	Born	Alma mater	Tenure started	Tenure ended	Duration
The Right Honourable; Charles Frederick Cunningham Macaskie; CMG	26 March 1888 (died 26 November 1969 (aged 81))	Gray's Inn	1934	1945	10–11 years
Japanese occupation of North Borneo (December 1941–September 1945)
The Right Honourable Sir; Ivor Llewellyn Brace	September 1898 (died 24 October 1952 (aged 54))	University College of South Wales and Monmouthshire	1945	1951	5–6 years
The Right Honourable Sir; Ivor Llewellyn Brace	September 1898 (died 24 October 1952 (aged 54))	London University	1945	1951	5–6 years

=== Unified Judiciary of Sarawak, North Borneo and Brunei (1951 to 1963) ===
Name	Born	Alma mater	Tenure started	Tenure ended	Duration
The Right Honourable Sir; Ivor Llewellyn Brace	September 1898 (died 24 October 1952 (aged 54))	University College of South Wales and Monmouthshire	1 December 1951	24 October 1952	329 days
The Right Honourable Sir; Ivor Llewellyn Brace	September 1898 (died 24 October 1952 (aged 54))	London University	1 December 1951	24 October 1952	329 days
The Right Honourable Sir; Ernest Hillas Williams; JP	16 August 1899 (died 5 February 1965 (aged 65))	Trinity College Dublin	1957	1957	0 years
The Right Honourable Sir; John Ainley; MC	10 May 1906 (died 19 January 1992 (aged 85))	Corpus Christi College, Oxford	5 December 1959	1 January 1963	3 years and 28 days
The Right Honourable Sir; William Campbell Wylie; ED QC	14 May 1905 (died 17 August 1992 (aged 87))	Victoria University of Wellington	2 January 1963	15 September 1963	1 year and 347 days

=== Borneo (1963 to 1994) ===
Name	Portrait	Born	Alma mater	Tenure started	Tenure ended	Duration
The Right Honourable Sir; William Campbell Wylie; ED QC		14 May 1905 (died 17 August 1992 (aged 87))	Victoria University of Wellington	16 September 1963	27 August 1965	1 year and 346 days
The Right Honourable Sir Tan Sri; Philip Ernest Housden Pike; PMN QC		6 March 1914 (died ?)	Middle Temple	11 September 1965	27 August 1968	2 years and 352 days
Yang Amat Arif Tan Sri Dato'; Ismail Khan Ibrahim Khan; PMN PSM PPT BKT		18 June 1905 (died 18 April 2000 (aged 94))	University College, London	2 September 1968	31 December 1973	5 years and 121 days
Yang Amat Arif Tan Sri Dato'; Ismail Khan Ibrahim Khan; PMN PSM PPT BKT		18 June 1905 (died 18 April 2000 (aged 94))	Middle Temple	2 September 1968	31 December 1973	5 years and 121 days
Yang Amat Arif Tan Sri Datuk Amar; Hun Hoe Lee; PMN DA SPDK PGDK PNBS ADK		27 September 1923 (died 8 July 2005 (aged 81))	University of Southampton	1 January 1974	31 December 1988	15 years and 0 days
Yang Amat Arif Tan Sri Datuk Amar; Hun Hoe Lee; PMN DA SPDK PGDK PNBS ADK		27 September 1923 (died 8 July 2005 (aged 81))	Lincoln's Inn	1 January 1974	31 December 1988	15 years and 0 days
Yang Amat Arif Tan Sri Datuk Amar; Mohamad Jemuri Serjan; PMN DA SPDK PNBS JMN JBS PPC		10 September 1929 (died 26 January 2022 (aged 92))	-	11 March 1989	23 June 1994	5 years and 105 days

=== Sabah and Sarawak (1994 to present) ===
Name	Portrait	Born	Alma mater	Tenure started	Tenure ended	Duration	Prior senior judicial roles
Yang Amat Arif Tan Sri Datuk Amar; Mohamad Jemuri Serjan; PMN DA SPDK PNBS JMN JBS PPC		10 September 1929 (died 26 January 2022 (aged 92))	-	24 June 1994	9 September 1994	78 days	Judge of the Supreme Court of Malaysia (1989–1994)
Yang Amat Arif Tan Sri Datuk Amar; Siew Fai Chong; PSM DA PNBS		4 January 1935 (died 23 January 2006 (aged 71))	Lincoln's Inn	16 June 1995	3 July 2000	5 years and 18 days	Judge of the High Court of Malaysia (1978–1994)
Yang Amat Arif Tan Sri Datuk Amar; Siew Fai Chong; PSM DA PNBS		4 January 1935 (died 23 January 2006 (aged 71))	Lincoln's Inn	16 June 1995	3 July 2000	5 years and 18 days	Judge of the Federal Court of Malaysia (1994–2000)
Yang Amat Arif Tan Sri Datuk Amar; Steve Lip Kiong Shim; PSM DA PJN JBK KMN PPB		20 January 1940 (age 86)	Inner Temple	2 July 2000	19 July 2006	6 years and 24 days	Judge of the High Court of Malaysia (1992–2000)
Yang Amat Arif Tan Sri Datuk Amar; Steve Lip Kiong Shim; PSM DA PJN JBK KMN PPB		20 January 1940 (age 86)	Vrije Universiteit Brussel	2 July 2000	19 July 2006	6 years and 24 days	Judge of the Federal Court of Malaysia (2000–2006)
Yang Amat Arif Tan Sri Datuk Seri Panglima; Richard Malanjum; PSM SPSK SSAP SIMP SPDK PGDK		13 October 1952 (age 73)	MARA University of Technology	26 July 2006	11 July 2018	11 years and 351 days	Judge of the High Court of Malaysia (2004–2006)
Yang Amat Arif Tan Sri Datuk Seri Panglima; Richard Malanjum; PSM SPSK SSAP SIMP SPDK PGDK		13 October 1952 (age 73)	University of London	26 July 2006	11 July 2018	11 years and 351 days	Judge of the Court of Appeal of Malaysia (2002–2005)
Yang Amat Arif Tan Sri Datuk Seri Panglima; Richard Malanjum; PSM SPSK SSAP SIMP SPDK PGDK		13 October 1952 (age 73)	Gray's Inn	26 July 2006	11 July 2018	11 years and 351 days	Judge of the Federal Court of Malaysia (2005–2018)
Yang Amat Arif Tan Sri Datuk Seri Panglima; David Dak Wah Wong; PSM SPDK PGDK		20 August 1953 (age 73)	University of New South Wales	11 July 2018	19 February 2020	1 year and 224 days	Judge of the High Court of Malaysia (2007–2013)
Yang Amat Arif Tan Sri Datuk Seri Panglima; David Dak Wah Wong; PSM SPDK PGDK		20 August 1953 (age 73)	University of New South Wales	11 July 2018	19 February 2020	1 year and 224 days	Judge of the Court of Appeal of Malaysia (2013–2018)
Yang Amat Arif Tan Sri Datuk Seri Panglima; David Dak Wah Wong; PSM SPDK PGDK		20 August 1953 (age 73)	University of New South Wales	11 July 2018	19 February 2020	1 year and 224 days	Judge of the Federal Court of Malaysia (2018–2020)
Yang Amat Arif Tan Sri Datuk Amar; Abang Iskandar Abang Hashim; PSM DA DSPN		3 July 1959 (age 67)	University of Malaya	25 February 2020	17 January 2023	2 years and 327 days	Judge of the High Court of Malaysia (2008–2013)
Yang Amat Arif Tan Sri Datuk Amar; Abang Iskandar Abang Hashim; PSM DA DSPN		3 July 1959 (age 67)	University of Malaya	25 February 2020	17 January 2023	2 years and 327 days	Judge of the Court of Appeal of Malaysia (2013–2018)
Yang Amat Arif Tan Sri Datuk Amar; Abang Iskandar Abang Hashim; PSM DA DSPN		3 July 1959 (age 67)	University of Malaya	25 February 2020	17 January 2023	2 years and 327 days	Judge of the Federal Court of Malaysia (2018–2020)
Yang Amat Arif Tan Sri Dato'; Abdul Rahman Sebli; PSM DIMP PPB		25 January 1959 (age 67)	University of Malaya	17 January 2023	25 July 2025	2 years and 190 days	Judge of the High Court of Malaysia (2010–2013)
Yang Amat Arif Tan Sri Dato'; Abdul Rahman Sebli; PSM DIMP PPB		25 January 1959 (age 67)	University of Malaya	17 January 2023	25 July 2025	2 years and 190 days	Judge of the Court of Appeal of Malaysia (2013–2019)
Yang Amat Arif Tan Sri Dato'; Abdul Rahman Sebli; PSM DIMP PPB		25 January 1959 (age 67)	University of Malaya	17 January 2023	25 July 2025	2 years and 190 days	Judge of the Federal Court of Malaysia (2020–2023)
Yang Amat Arif; Azizah Nawawi		9 January 1962 (age 64)	University of Otago	28 July 2025	Incumbent	1 year and 42 days	Judicial Commissioner of the High Court of Malaysia (2012–2014)
Yang Amat Arif; Azizah Nawawi		9 January 1962 (age 64)	University of Otago	28 July 2025	Incumbent	1 year and 42 days	Judge of the High Court of Malaysia (2014–2019)
Yang Amat Arif; Azizah Nawawi		9 January 1962 (age 64)	University of Otago	28 July 2025	Incumbent	1 year and 42 days	Judge of the Court of Appeal of Malaysia (2019–2025)

== See also ==
- Courts of Malaysia
- High Courts (Malaysia)
