= Simon Sinang Bada =

Malaysian politician

Yang Berhormat Simon Sinang Bada JBK KMN MLA

Member of the Sarawak State Legislative Assembly for Tebedu
- Incumbent
- Assumed office 2021
- Preceded by: Michael Manyin Jawong

Personal details
- Born: Sinang anak Bada Sarawak
- Citizenship: Malaysian
- Party: PBB
- Other political affiliations: Gabungan Parti Sarawak
- Occupation: Politician

Simon Sinang @ Sinang anak Bada is a Malaysian politician from PBB. He has served as the Member of the Sarawak State Legislative Assembly for Tebedu since 2021.

== Election results ==
Sarawak State Legislative Assembly
Year	Constituency	Candidate	Votes	Pct.	Opponent(s)	Votes	Pct.	Ballots cast	Majority	Turnout
2021	N21 Tebedu	Simon Sinang Bada (PBB)	5,082	61.82%	Raymond Achen Kambeng (PSB)	1,809	22.00%	8,363	3,273	69.46%
2021	N21 Tebedu	Simon Sinang Bada (PBB)	5,082	61.82%	Jonathan Lantik O'k (PBK)	614	7.47	8,363	3,273	69.46%
2021	N21 Tebedu	Simon Sinang Bada (PBB)	5,082	61.82%	Senior William Rade (PKR)	610	7.42	8,363	3,273	69.46%
2021	N21 Tebedu	Simon Sinang Bada (PBB)	5,082	61.82%	Roland Bangu (IND)	106	1.29	8,363	3,273	69.46%

== Honours ==
- Malaysia
  - Officer of the Order of the Defender of the Realm (KMN) (2014)
- Sarawak
  - Companion of the Order of the Star of Hornbill Sarawak (JBK) (2026)
