= Gerald Rentap Jabu =

Malaysian politician

Yang Berhormat Datuk Gerald Rentap Jabu PGBK PPN MLA

State Deputy Minister for Youth, Sport and Entrepreneur Development of Sarawak (Youth and Sport)
- Incumbent
- Assumed office 4 January 2022 Serving with Ripin bin Lamat (Entrepreneur Development)
- Minister: Abdul Karim Rahman Hamzah
- Governor: Abdul Taib Mahmud; Wan Junaidi Tuanku Jaafar
- Chief Minister: Abang Abdul Rahman Johari Abang Openg
- Preceded by: Snowdan Lawan (State Assistant Minister of Youth and Sports)
- Constituency: Layar

Youth Chief of the Parti Pesaka Bumiputera Bersatu
- In office 9 February 2018 – 17 June 2022
- President: Abang Abdul Rahman Johari Abang Openg (2017-)
- Preceded by: Fadillah Yusof
- Succeeded by: Miro Simoh

Member of the Sarawak State Legislative Assembly for Layar
- Incumbent
- Assumed office 7 May 2016
- Preceded by: Alfred Jabu Numpang
- Majority: 1,428 (2016); 2,039 (2021)

Personal details
- Born: 23 March 1974 (age 52) Sarawak, Malaysia
- Citizenship: Malaysian
- Party: Parti Pesaka Bumiputera Bersatu (PBB)
- Other political affiliations: Barisan Nasional (BN) (-2018, allied: since 2020); Gabungan Parti Sarawak (GPS) (since 2018); Perikatan Nasional (PN) (allied: since 2020)
- Spouse: Rosemarie Wong
- Parents: Alfred Jabu Numpang (father); Empiang Antak Jabu (mother)

Gerald Rentap Jabu (born 23 March 1974), is a Malaysian politician from the Parti Pesaka Bumiputera Bersatu (PBB), a component party of the ruling Gabungan Parti Sarawak (GPS) coalition who has served as the State Deputy Minister for Youth, Sport and Entrepreneur Development of Sarawak in charge of Youth and Sport Development in the GPS state administration under Premier Abang Abdul Rahman Johari Abang Openg and Minister Abdul Karim Rahman Hamzah since January 2022. He is a Member of the Sarawak State Legislative Assembly (MLA) for Layar since May 2016.

Jabu holds a bachelor's degree from La Trobe University.

== Early life and education ==
Gerald Rentap Jabu was born in 1974 as the oldest child cum only son out of four children (three daughters and one son) to former Deputy Chief Minister/Deputy Premier, Datuk Patinggi Tan Sri Dr. Alfred Jabu anak Numpang (born 26 October 1940) and former senator, Tan Sri Dato Sri Empiang Antak Jabu (born 18 February 1946), both prominent figures in Sarawak state politics. He started his education at SMB St. Thomas, Kuching, where he graduated in 1986. He pursued his secondary education at St Bede's College in Mentone, Melbourne, Victoria, Australia, graduating with a Higher School Certificate of Education in 1991. In 1993, Jabu completed his bachelor's degree, majoring in Banking and Finance, at La Trobe University also in Melbourne, Victoria, Australia. The following year, he joined the Atelier Society of Sarawak and served as Treasurer until 1996.

== Business career ==
Jabu’s career began right after graduation in 1993 as a Management Trainee at Shangri-La Properties Sdn Bhd. In the same year, he joined the Sarawak Bumiputera Entrepreneurs Council (DUBS), where he has remained a longstanding member of the organisation. From 1994 to 1995, he worked as a Licensed Dealer Representative (Corporate Dealing) at Sarawak Securities Sdn Bhd, followed by a Project Manager position at Sarawak Capital Sdn Bhd from 1995 to 1996.

From 1997 to 2022, he served as an Executive Director for RT Cargo Group of Companies. He also held the position of Non-Executive Director at Sarawak Oil Palms Bhd from 1999 to 2017 and at PanGlobal Insurance Bhd from 2004 to 2006. Since 1996, Jabu has been a Director of Utahol Management Sdn Bhd, a position he continues to hold today. He also served as a Board Member of Syarikat Sesco Berhad from 2005 to 2003. Since 2014, he has also been a Director of Permodalan Saberkas Berhad.

== Sports organization ==
Jabu began his involvement in sports organizations as the Chairman of the Jet Ski Section at the Sarawak Adventure Club from 1993 to 1995. He became active in golf, serving as a pro tempore member of the Sarawak Dayak Golf Association (DGA) from 2004 to 2005 and subsequently as its President from 2005 to 2012. In 2013, he became Treasurer of the Sarawak Shooting Association, a position he held until 2019. He continued with the association as Vice President from 2019 to 2021. Jabu served as Vice President of the Sarawak Weightlifting Association from 2015 to 2017, before being appointed its President from 2017 to 2023. Since 2018, he has been active at the national level, as Vice President of the Malaysia Weightlifting Federation.

== Political career ==
In 1996, Jabu became a Member of the Higher Council for Pergerakan Pemuda (youth wing) of the Parti Pesaka Bumiputera Bersatu (PBB), beginning his deeper involvement with the party. From 2001 to 2007, he served as Vice General Secretary of Pergerakan Pemuda PBB. He then became General Secretary from 2008 to 2013. During 2009 to 2013, he also served as a Committee Member for Sarawak United National Youth Organisation (SABERKAS). By 2013, he had progressed to other roles in both PBB and SABERKAS, taking on the position of Vice Treasurer for SABERKAS and serving as Vice Chief of Pergerakan Pemuda PBB.

In May 2016, Jabu won the N36 Layar State Legislative Assembly seat in the 2016 Sarawak state election, succeeding his father, Datuk Patinggi Tan Sri Dr. Alfred Jabu Numpang. He defeated PKR's Vernon Albert Kedit, receiving 3,931 votes to Vernon's 2,503. In 2018, Jabu replaced Fadillah Yusof as the Youth Chief of PBB representing the Pesaka wing.

In December 2021, Jabu secured his second term after defeating Isik Utau from PSB. He garnered 3,891 votes to Utau’s 1,852 votes. He held the Youth Chief of PBB position until 2022, when he was then replaced by Miro Simoh, also from the Pesaka wing. Jabu is currently serving as one of three Pesaka wing Vice-Presidents of PBB for the 2025-2028 term.

== Deputy Minister ==
On December 30, 2021, Jabu was appointed Deputy Minister for Youth, Sports and Entrepreneur Development Sarawak (Youth & Sports) within the second Abang Johari cabinet. He took part in a hybrid swearing-in ceremony with fellow cabinet members on January 4, 2022.

Jabu has supported initiatives such as youth startup programs, leadership trainings, and international exposure opportunities. He has been emphasizing the importance of STEM education, digital advancements, and AI, as a strategy to ensure that young Sarawakians remain competitive in the future job market.

Jabu served as chef de mission for the Sarawak contingent at 2022 and 2024 Sukma Games. In 2024, the Sarawak contingent won their fourth overall championship, ending a 30-year wait. The Malaysian government has chosen Sarawak to co-host the 2027 SEA Games, citing its excellent facilities and proven success in hosting the 2024 Sukma Games. He has been promoting the organization of more national, regional, and international junior sports events in Sarawak to increase exposure opportunities for young players.

Jabu yielded an approval rating of 46% on an online survey conducted in early 2025 regarding ministers of Dayak ethnicity.

== Election results ==
Sarawak State Legislative Assembly
Year	Constituency	Candidate	Votes	Pct	Opponent(s)	Votes	Pct	Ballots Cast	Majority	Turnout
2016	Layar	Gerald Rentap Jabu (PBB)	3,931	61.10%	Vernon Albert Kedit (PKR)	2,503	38.90%	6,434	1,428	72.38%
2021	Layar	Gerald Rentap Jabu (PBB)	3,891	67.75%	Isik Utau (PSB)	1,852	32.25%	5,743	2,039	63.17%

== Personal life ==
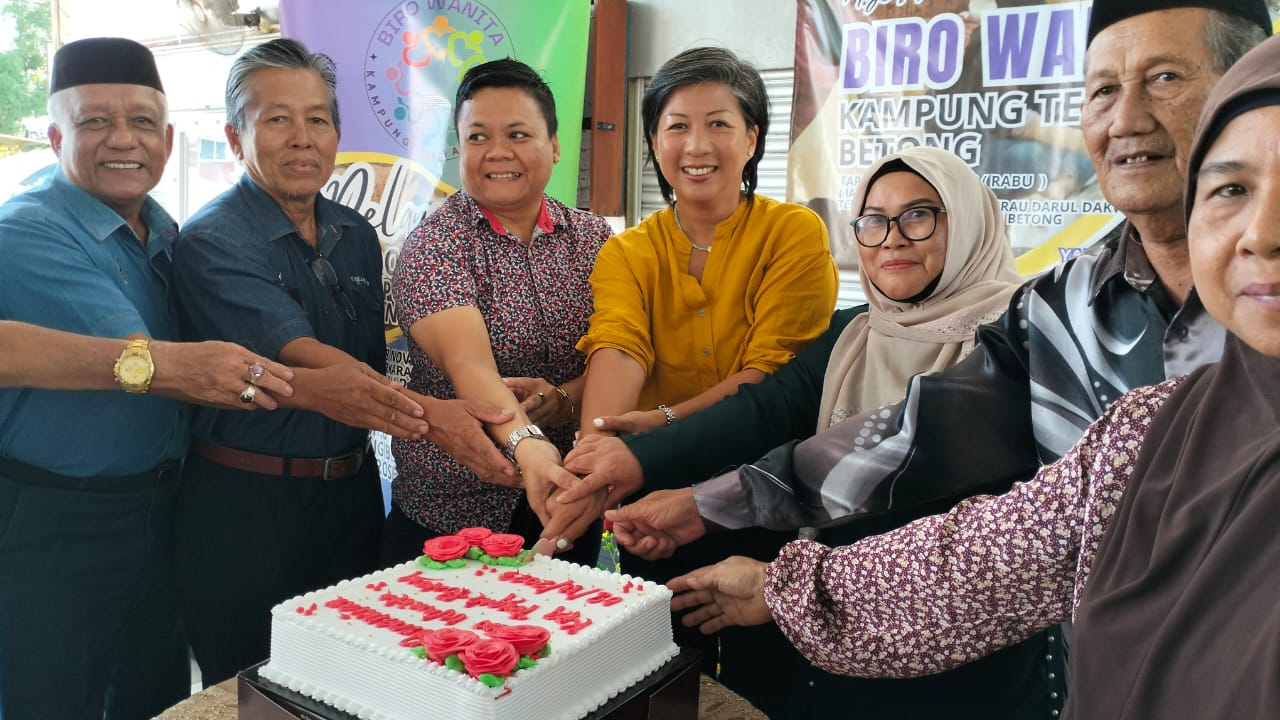
Rosemarie Wong (yellow) during the launch of Betong District Women's Bureau

Jabu is married to Datin Rosemarie Wong, a Malaysian Chinese businesswoman of Sino-Iban descent with Hakka-Iban (paternal side and maternal grandfather) and Cantonese (maternal grandmother) ancestry from Limbang, and they have four children.

== Honors ==
- Malaysia
  - Medal of the Order of the Defender of the Realm (PPN) (2013)
- Sarawak
  - Commander of the Order of the Star of Hornbill Sarawak (PGBK) – Datuk (2025)
  - Commander of the Most Exalted Order of the Star of Sarawak (PSBS) – Dato' (2023)
  - Companion of the Order of the Star of Hornbill Sarawak (JBK) (2021)
  - Member of the Most Exalted Order of the Star of Sarawak (ABS) (2011)
  - Diamond Jubilee Commemorative Medal (Gold), in Conjunction of 60 Years Sarawak Independence Day (2023)
