= British Military Administration (Borneo) =

Interim administrator of British Borneo, 1945–1946

British Military Administration of Borneo Borneo
- 1945–1946
- Flag Royal coat of arms

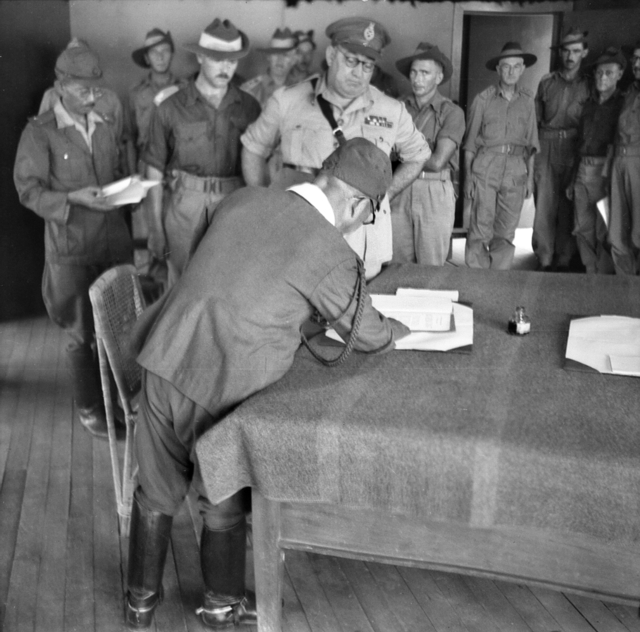
- Japanese forces surrender to Australians in Labuan on 1945.
- Status: Transitional government
- Capital: Victoria
- Government: Military occupation
- Chief Civil Affairs Officer
  - 1945–1946: Brigadier Charles Macaskie
- Historical era: Post-war
  - Surrender of Japan: 15 August 1945
  - British Military Administration set up: 12 September 1945
  - Formation of the Crown Colony: 1 July 1946
- Currency: British North Borneo dollar, Sarawak dollar
Preceded by
Japanese occupation of British Borneo
Succeeded by
Crown Colony of Sarawak
Crown Colony of North Borneo
Brunei
- Today part of: Malaysia; Brunei

The British Military Administration (BMA) was the interim administrator of British Borneo between the end of the Second World War and the establishment of the Crown colonies of Sarawak and North Borneo in 1946. Specifically, the entity lasted from 12 September 1945 to 1 July 1946. Labuan became the headquarters of BMA. The headquarters was mostly managed by the Australian Imperial Force (AIF). The area under this administration today comprises Labuan, Sabah, Sarawak, and Brunei. Sarawak was administered by Australians under British Borneo Civil Affairs Unit (BBCAU).

== Background ==
Following Singapore's surrender to the Japanese on 15 February 1942, the Colonial Office started developing a strategy for post-war constitutional and administrative reforms in Malaya and the Borneo territories. Singapore had been the centre of British authority in Southeast Asia. The British public was critical of the British pre-war colonial policy in the region, which was partly to blame for their defeat by the Japanese, while the Americans, who saw the European colonies and dependencies as obstacles to their political and economic interests in the region, believed that the European colonies should be liberated and given opportunities for self-determination. These two factors had a significant impact on British policy makers in London.

The British Secretary of State for the Colonies submitted a memo on the constitutional policies that should be followed in Malaya and the Borneo territories after they were liberated from the Japanese, and the British War Cabinet appointed a committee from among its members on 6 January 1944, to consider the memo and make recommendations for post-war constitutional and administrative changes. A directive for military planners was required because it had been decided that a transitional military government would be used to re-establish the administrative infrastructure in the territories. This would allow the military planners to follow civil policy and make it easier to introduce constitutional amendments. The Committee endorsed the broad outlines of the program outlined in the Colonial Secretary's note at its first meeting on 22 March 1944.

It was advised that, in order to accomplish these goals, the British North Borneo (Chartered) Company's 1881-founded management should be dissolved and taken over by the British Government following payment of compensation to the company. The new Administration for North Borneo was to include the British Settlement of Labuan. The Committee also suggested that new treaties be quickly negotiated between the British Government and the Rajah of Sarawak and the Sultan of Brunei. The treaty stipulates that the British Monarch would be granted complete jurisdiction over the States, allowing them to enact laws for these areas in accordance with the Foreign Jurisdiction Act. The new contract was designed to ensure that the Rajah of Sarawak would accept the presence of a resident British adviser, whose counsel must be sought out and considered in all significant areas of policy and administration. The Secretary of State did not foresee any issues being raised over the transfer of authority to the British Monarch by either the Rajah of Sarawak or the Sultan of Brunei. The British government was also concerned by potential attempts by the effectively Australia-run British Borneo Civil Affairs Unit to exercise longer-term control over the Bornean territories.

== History ==
The British Military Administration (BMA), took over the civil affairs administration when the Australian Forces were removed from British Borneo. Although the Australian BBCAU was disbanded, many of its members volunteered to continue serving until British Borneo's administration was transferred to civil government because of a severe personnel shortage. The Borneo territories were still recognised as a one entity under the BBCAU, with Labuan serving as its capital, but the divisions were reorganised into two regions: North Borneo Area and Sarawak Area, each with four divisions. The North Borneo Area included the Brunei-Labuan Division. The BMA's Chief Civil Affairs Officer, Brigadier Macaskie, was reappointed. His key responsibilities were upholding law and order among civilians, reestablishing communications, public utilities and services, and vital industries; organising the distribution of products; and advising and representing the local Commanders in their interactions with civilians. Additionally, he was told to take the required actions to set the groundwork for future civil governance by establishing the basic administrative structure inside the freed regions as much as feasible.

The War Office informed Lord Mountbatten on 10 December 1945 that the responsibility for the civil administrations in the four territories of British Borneo should be taken over by the Colonial Office as soon as possible; to that end, a target date of 1 March 1946 was set with the Colonial Office for planning purposes. Vyner Brooke of Sarawak unexpectedly decided to relinquish Sarawak to the British Crown on his own following discussions between the Colonial Office and the Rajah. At the end of March, the Rajah intended to make a quick trip back to Sarawak to win their approval and make sure the cession was in line with their intentions. But there had been little progress in the talks with the Chartered Company to hand over control of North Borneo to the British Crown. According to a British Cabinet decision, British North Borneo could not be returned to the Chartered Company, and civil government could not be created until an agreement was achieved.

All four Borneo territories had returned to civil rule by July 1946. Rajah Vyner Brooke officially handed his power to the British Crown on 15 July, leading to the establishment of a new Colonial Administration in Sarawak. The British North Borneo (Chartered) Company's government was abolished after the conclusion of discussions between the Colonial Office and the Chartered Company, and on 15 July a Colonial Administration was founded in Sarawak. On the same day, Labuan was integrated into the new colony and handed over to civil governance.

Sarawak Chinese raised the Kuomintang flags in Kuching after the surrender of the Japanese, believing that the Chinese army had a major role in defeating the Japanese. Such actions caused dissatisfaction among the Iban and the Malay people in Sarawak for not raising the Sarawak flag instead. A celebration was held on 10 October 1945 to celebrate the Allied victory and the national day of the Republic of China. The next day, a quarrel broke out between the Chinese and Malays. Later about 1,000 Chinese assembled near the Brooke Dockyard near the Main Bazaar in Kuching, preparing to attack mosques and Malay villages there. However, the fight did not break out because the Australian military quickly confiscated all the weapons and started a 24-hour curfew.

== See also ==
- British Military Administration (Malaya)
- Japanese occupation of British Borneo
