= Steve Shim Lip Kiong =

Malaysian judge and lawyer

Yang Amat Arif Tan Sri Datuk Amar Steve Shim Lip Kiong PSM DA PJN JBK KMN PPB
- 沈立强

3rd Chief Judge of Sabah and Sarawak
- In office 2 July 2000 – 25 July 2006
- Nominated by: Mahathir Mohamad
- Appointed by: Salahuddin
- Preceded by: Chong Siew Fai
- Succeeded by: Richard Malanjum

Personal details
- Born: Steve Shim Lip Kiong; 20 January 1940 (age 86) Kuching, Kuching Division, Raj of Sarawak (now Sarawak, Malaysia)
- Citizenship: Malaysian
- Education: Inner Temple; Vrije Universiteit Brussel
- Occupation: Judge
- Profession: Lawyer

Steve Shim Lip Kiong

Chinese name
- Traditional Chinese: 沈立強
- Hanyu Pinyin: Shěn Lìqiáng
- Jyutping: Sam2 Laap6 Koeng4
- Hokkien POJ: Sím Li̍p-kiông
- Tâi-lô: Sím Li̍p-kiông

Tan Sri Datuk Amar Steve Shim Lip Kiong (simplified Chinese: 沈立强; traditional Chinese: 沈立強; pinyin: Shěn Lìqiáng; born 20 January 1940) is a Malaysian lawyer and judge who served as the third Chief Judge of Sabah and Sarawak.

== Early life and education ==
Shim was born in Kuching in the then-British protectorate state of Raj of Sarawak. He completed his A Level studies in Westminster College, London, United Kingdom in 1962 before receiving his barrister-at-law from the Inner Temple in 1969. In 1980, Shim graduated from the Faculty of International and Comparative Law at Vrije Universiteit Brussel, Brussels, Belgium with a Master of Laws (Honours) (LL.M. (Hons.)).

== Career ==
=== 1970 & 1980s ===
Shim's career in the legal service began on 10 August 1970 when he became a cadet legal officer. By 1977, he was made a registrar at the High Court of Borneo. In between, Shim had also served as a crown counsel and magistrate. His career then progressed further when he was appointed as a sessions courts judge in 1989.

=== 1990 & 2000s ===
On 1 March 1992, Shim was appointed as a judicial commissioner at the High Court in Sibu. He served in that capacity for just five months before being promoted as judge of the same High Court in August 1992. As a High Court judge, Shim took postings in Kuching and later Kuala Lumpur, the capital city of Malaysia, beginning 1996.

Having served as a High Court judge for almost eight years, Shim was chosen to take over duties as acting Chief Judge of the High Court of Sabah and Sarawak in July 2000. He officially ascended to the fourth highest judicial office in Malaysia, after the Chief Justice of Malaysia, President of the Court of Appeal of Malaysia and Chief Judge of Malaya, in September 2000.

Shim retired from the legal service on 19 July 2006.

=== 2010s ===
In 2011, Shim was selected to chair the newly-created National Wage Consultative Council placed under the Ministry of Human Resources of Malaysia.

Following the loss of Mohammad Najib Abdul Razak and his Barisan Nasional (BN) coalition in the 14th Malaysian general election, Shim was selected to chair a special tribunal formed in 17 October 2018 to probe and seek the removal of six members of the Election Commission of Malaysia (SPR) after thirteen charges were framed against the latter. In May 2019, Shim deemed the matter academic and announced that the tribunal has decided to no longer proceed its probe after the personnel in question all opted for early resignation. This decision earned him a rebuke from the Attorney General of Malaysia, Tommy Thomas.

== Honours ==
- Malaysia
  - Officer of the Order of the Defender of the Realm (KMN) (1988)
  - Commander of the Order of Meritorious Service (PJN) - Datuk (1999)
  - Commander of the Order of Loyalty to the Crown of Malaysia (PSM) - Tan Sri (2001)
- Sarawak
  - Meritorious Service Medal-Silver (PPB)
  - Companion of the Order of the Star of Hornbill Sarawak (JBK)
  - Knight Commander of the Order of the Star of Hornbill Sarawak (DA) - Datuk Amar (2003)

Legal offices
Preceded by Chong Siew Fai	Chief Judge of Sabah and Sarawak; 2000–2006	Succeeded by Richard Malanjum
