= William Campbell Wylie =

New Zealand-born colonial judge

Sir William Campbell Wylie

Attorney General of British Guiana
- In office 1955–1956

Attorney General of Barbados
- In office 1951–1955

Personal details
- Born: William Campbell Wylie; 14 May 1905 Dannevirke, New Zealand
- Died: August 1992 (aged 87)

Sir William Campbell Wylie (14 May 1905 – August 1992) was a New Zealand-born colonial judge who was the last Chief Justice of the Combined Judiciary of Sarawak, North Borneo and Brunei and the first Chief Justice of Borneo.

== Early life and education ==
He was born in Dannevirke, New Zealand and educated at Auckland Grammar School and the Victoria University of Wellington. He graduated in law in 1928 and practised at Kaikohe until the Second World War, when he served in the legal department of the Army in the Pacific and the Middle East.

== Career ==
In 1946 he joined the Colonial Legal Service in British Malaya and in the 1950s was appointed Attorney-General of Barbados (1951–55) and British Guiana, after which he was Justice of Appeal in the West Indies. He was knighted in 1963.

In 1963 he was made the last Chief Justice of the Combined Judiciary of Sarawak, North Borneo and Brunei and in the same year became the first Chief Justice of Borneo (until his retirement in 1965). In retirement he was briefly involved in law reform in Tonga and the Seychelles.

He married Leita Clark in 1933.

Legal offices
| New creation | Chief Justice of Borneo; 1963–1965 | Succeeded by Sir Philip Ernest Housden Pike |
| Preceded by Sir John Ainley | Chief Justice of the Combined Judiciary of Sarawak, North Borneo and Brunei; 1963 | Formation of the office of Chief Justice of Borneo following formation of Malaysia |
| Preceded by Edward Keith Walcott | Attorney-General of Barbados; 1951–1955 | Succeeded by Sir Frederick Smith |
