= Ernest Hillas Williams =

Irish colonial judge

The Right Honourable Sir Ernest Hillas Williams JP
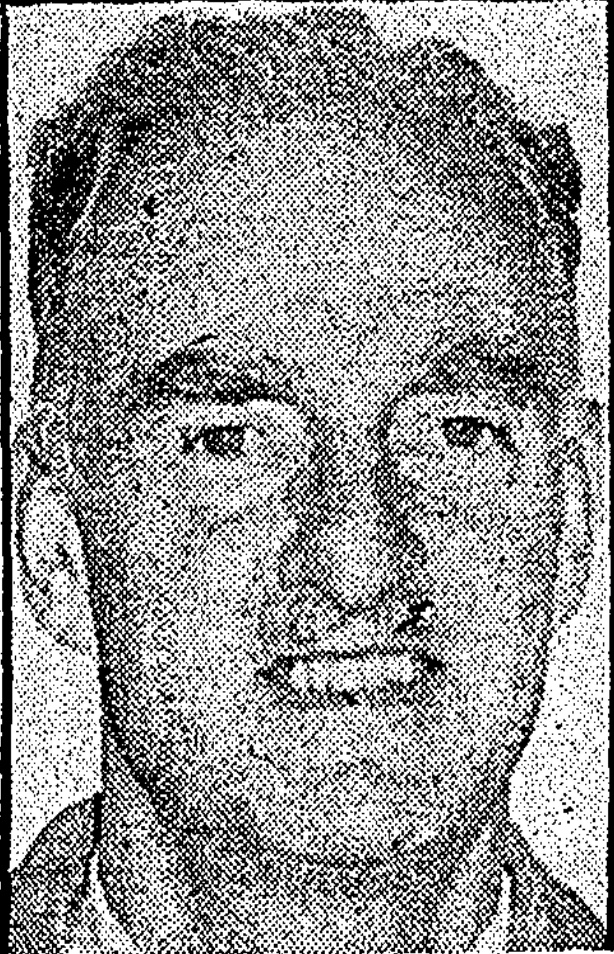

2nd Chief Justice of the Combined Judiciary of Sarawak, North Borneo and Brunei
- In office 1957–1957
- Nominated by: Anthony Eden
- Appointed by: Elizabeth II
- Preceded by: Sir Ivor Llewellyn Brace
- Succeeded by: Sir John Ainley

Secretary for Chinese Affairs Acting
- Covering duties 22 September 1937 – 20 October 1937
- Monarch: George VI
- Governor: Vacant
- Colonial Secretary: Sir Thomas Southorn
- Covering duties 5 September 1935 – 3 October 1935
- Monarch: George V
- Governor: Vacant
- Colonial Secretary: Sir Thomas Southorn

Personal details
- Born: 16 August 1899 Cork, Munster, Ireland
- Died: 5 February 1965 (aged 65) Málaga, Spain
- Resting place: English Cemetery, Málaga, Andalusia, Spain
- Citizenship: Irish
- Spouse: Mary Howard Williams

Military service
- Allegiance: United Kingdom
- Branch/service: British Army
- Rank: Sergeant
- Unit: Hong Kong Volunteer Defence Corps
- Battles/wars: World War II

Sir Ernest Hillas Williams JP (16 August 1899 – 5 February 1965) was an Irish judge who served as a British Empire colonial official based for most of his career in British Hong Kong and later also the second Chief Justice of the Combined Judiciary of Sarawak, North Borneo and Brunei.

== Career ==
Williams received a BA in mathematics from Trinity College Dublin in 1922. While serving in the Colonial Service, Williams was promoted from colonial administrator to puisne judge and later also served as the assistant Attorney General of Hong Kong. Over the course of his time in British Hong Kong, Williams was twice appointed acting Secretary for Chinese Affairs of the Executive Council of Hong Kong. Following the events of World War II, Williams was sent to British Borneo and succeeded Sir Ivor Llewellyn Brace as Chief Justice of the Combined Judiciary of Sarawak, North Borneo and Brunei.

Williams was also a sergeant in the Hong Kong Volunteer Defence Corps.

== Prisoner of war ==
Williams was a prisoner of war (POW) held at a camp in Sham Shui Po Barracks before later being moved to Innoshima, Hiroshima Prefecture by the Imperial Japanese Army.

== Honours ==
- United Kingdom :
  - Knight Bachelor (Kt) – Sir (1957)

== Death ==
Williams died in early February 1965 whilst in the town of Málaga, Spain.

== See also ==
- Chief Judge of Sabah and Sarawak
- Secretary for Justice (Hong Kong)

Legal offices
Preceded by Sir Ivor Llewellyn Brace	Chief Justice of the Combined Judiciary of Sarawak, North Borneo and Brunei; 1957	Succeeded by Sir John Ainley
