= Lee Hun Hoe =

Malaysian judge and lawyer

Yang Amat Arif Tan Sri Datuk Seri Panglima Lee Hun Hoe PMN SPDK DA PNBS
- 李漢和

4th Chief Justice of Borneo
- In office 1 January 1974 – 31 December 1988
- Nominated by: Abdul Razak Hussein
- Appointed by: Abdul Halim
- Preceded by: Ismail Khan Ibrahim Khan
- Succeeded by: Mohamad Jemuri Serjan

Personal details
- Born: Lee Hun Hoe; 27 September 1923 Alor Setar, Kedah, Unfederated Malay States, British Malaya (now Malaysia)
- Died: 8 July 2005 (aged 81) Kuching, Sarawak, Malaysia
- Resting place: Nirvana Memorial Park, Bau, Kuching Division, Sarawak, Malaysia
- Citizenship: Malaysian
- Spouse: Fredia Temiang Wong
- Education: University of Southampton; Lincoln's Inn
- Occupation: Judge
- Profession: Lawyer

Lee Hun Hoe

Chinese name
- Traditional Chinese: 李漢和
- Simplified Chinese: 李汉和
Transcriptions
Standard Mandarin
- Hanyu Pinyin: Lǐ Hànhé
Yue: Cantonese
- Jyutping: Lei5 Hon3 Wo4
Southern Min
- Hokkien POJ: Lí Hàn-hô
- Tâi-lô: Lí Hàn-hô

Tan Sri Datuk Seri Panglima Lee Hun Hoe (simplified Chinese: 李汉和; traditional Chinese: 李漢和; pinyin: Lǐ Hànhé; Jyutping: Lei5 Hon3 Wo4; Pe̍h-ōe-jī: Lí Hàn-hô; 27 September 1923 – 8 July 2005) was a Malaysian lawyer and judge who served as the fourth Chief Justice of Borneo.

== Early life and education ==
Lee was born the eldest son in Alor Setar in the then-British protectorate state of Kedah in 1923 before shortly moving to another British protectorate, the Raj of Sarawak on the island of Borneo, at the age of 1. Growing up in Kuching, Lee would complete his primary and secondary education in 1948. After electing to join the government service in 1949, he would serve in the secretariat department for a mere two years before being transferred to the judicial department in 1951. Then, he was awarded a Colonial and Development Fund Scholarship to read law at the University of Southampton in the United Kingdom. In 1955, Lee graduated from the university with a Bachelor of Laws with honours (LL.B. (Hons)).

Upon graduation, Lee was called to the English Bar at Lincoln's Inn. There, he received his postgraduate certificate from the Council of Legal Education and returned to Sarawak thereafter.

== Career ==
Following Lee's return from the UK, he served as a stipendiary magistrate from 1956 to 1965. Concurrently, he had also acted as Crown Counsel, deputy public prosecutor (DPP) and registrar. Later, he was also appointed chairman of the advisory committee from 1962 to 1964. Throughout his career, Lee would on various occasions be appointed judicial commissioner whenever a High Court judge was unavailable.

On 17 May 1965, Lee was promoted to the High Court in Borneo Bench. This led to him being appointed as chairman of the Royal Commission of Inquiry (RCI) to look into the practice and administration of the Seremban Town Board. After two years as judge, Lee was posted to Sabah on 30 August 1967 to serve as senior puisne judge. On 1 January 1974, he was appointed to the office of Chief Justice of Borneo. Lee held that office until his retirement on 31 December 1988, upon turning 65 years of age. Lee currently holds the distinction of being the longest serving Chief Justice of the High Court in Borneo, now renamed the High Court in Sabah and Sarawak.

== Honours ==
- Malaysia
  - Commander of the Order of the Defender of the Realm (PMN) - Tan Sri (1974)
- Sabah
  - Member of the Order of Kinabalu (ADK)
  - Commander of the Order of Kinabalu (PGDK) - Datuk
  - Grand Commander of the Order of Kinabalu (SPDK) - Datuk Seri Panglima
- Sarawak
  - Knight Commander of the Order of the Star of Sarawak (PNBS) - Dato Sri
  - Knight Commander of the Order of the Star of Hornbill Sarawak (DA) - Datuk Amar (1988)

== Personal life ==
Lee was married to Puan Sri Datin Amar Fredia Temiang Wong, a local Sarawakian Chinese of mixed Iban descent, together, they have four daughters and an adopted son.

In addition, outside his legal and judicial careers, he also has served as a board director or a chairman of certain companies hitherto stated below;

- Chairman of Hexza Corporation Limited
- Chairman of Wah Tat Bank
- Chairman of Natural Avenue Propriety Limited

== Death ==
Lee died on 8 July 2005 after a short illness at his home in Kuching at the age of 82, around 16–17 years after his retirement from the judicial and legal services.

Legal offices
Preceded by Ismail Khan Ibrahim Khan	Chief Justice of Borneo; 1974–1988	Succeeded by Mohamad Jemuri Serjan
