= Mohamad Jemuri Serjan =

Malaysian judge (1929–2022)

Yang Amat Arif Tan Sri Datuk Amar Mohamad Jemuri Serjan PMN DA SPDK PNBS JMN PPC
- محمد جموري بن سرجان

1st Chief Judge of Sabah and Sarawak
- In office 24 June 1994 – 9 September 1994
- Nominated by: Mahathir Mohamad
- Appointed by: Azlan Shah
- Preceded by: Himself
- Succeeded by: Chong Siew Fai

5th Chief Justice of Borneo
- In office 11 March 1989 – 23 June 1994
- Nominated by: Mahathir Mohamad
- Appointed by: Azlan Shah
- Preceded by: Lee Hun Hoe
- Succeeded by: Himself

Personal details
- Born: Mohamad Jemuri bin Serjan; 10 September 1929 Kuching, Raj of Sarawak (now Sarawak, Malaysia)
- Died: 26 January 2022 (aged 92) Kuching, Sarawak, Malaysia
- Citizenship: Malaysian
- Occupation: Teacher; Judge

Mohamad Jemuri bin Serjan (10 September 1929 – 26 January 2022) was a Malaysian judge who served as the last Chief Justice of Borneo and the first Chief Judge of Sabah and Sarawak.

== Life and career ==
Jemuri was born on 10 September 1929 to Serjan Wakijan and Jede Othman in Kuching. After graduating from school, Jemuri joined the Sarawak Education Department as a junior untrained teacher and taught at the Green Road National Secondary School. In 1955, he was transferred to serve in the Sarawak administrative service where he had his first encounter with law and legal work.

On 1 June 1965, Jemuri became a stipendiary magistrate. He was then appointed assistant Attorney-General of Sarawak on 8 November 1966. In 1973, Jemuri was promoted as Attorney-General (A-G) and held that office until his retirement in 1984. It was during his period in office that the infamous 1966 Sarawak constitutional crisis took place which resulted in the removal of Stephen Kalong Ningkan as Chief Minister of Sarawak. However, he was later re-engaged on a contract basis and continued serving as A-G until 31 December 1987, following which he was appointed a judge of the Supreme Court of Malaysia. Finally, Jemuri was appointed the Chief Justice of Borneo on 11 March 1989, an office which he held until shortly after it was renamed the Chief Judge of Sabah and Sarawak before his retirement on 9 September 1994.

Jemuri died at a hospital in Kuching on 26 January 2022, at the age of 92.

== Honours ==
- Malaysia
  - Companion of the Order of the Defender of the Realm (JMN) (1976)
  - Commander of the Order of the Defender of the Realm (PMN) – Tan Sri (1992)
- Sabah
  - Grand Commander of the Order of Kinabalu (SPDK) – Datuk Seri Panglima (1994)
- Sarawak
  - Distinguished Service Medal-Gold (PPC)
  - Companion of the Order of the Star of Sarawak (JBS)
  - Knight Commander of the Order of the Star of Sarawak (PNBS) – Dato Sri
  - Knight Commander of the Order of the Star of Hornbill Sarawak (DA) – Datuk Amar (1992)

== See also ==
- 1966 Sarawak constitutional crisis

Legal offices
New title	Chief Judge of Sabah and Sarawak; 1994	Succeeded by Chong Siew Fai
Preceded by Lee Hun Hoe	Chief Justice of Borneo; 1989–1994	Office renamed Chief Judge of Sabah and Sarawak
Political offices
Preceded by Tan Chiaw Thong	Attorney General of Sarawak; 1974–1987	Succeeded by Fong Joo Chung
