= Tebedu (state constituency) =

State constituency in Sarawak, Malaysia

Tebedu (N21)
Sarawak constituency

State constituency
- Legislature: Sarawak State Legislative Assembly
MLA
Vacant
- Constituency created: 1987
- First contested: 1991
- Last contested: 2026

Tebedu is a state constituency in Sarawak, Malaysia, that has been represented in the Sarawak State Legislative Assembly since 1991.

The state constituency was created in the 1987 redistribution and is mandated to return a single member to the Sarawak State Legislative Assembly under the first past the post voting system.

== Demographics ==
Ethnic breakdown of Tebedu's electorate as of 2022
1. Sarawak bumiputera (96.1%)
2. Chinese (1.90%)
3. Malay-Muslim bumiputera (1.50%)
4. Other ethnicities (0.50%)

== History ==
As of 2020, Tebedu has a population of 21,956 people.

=== Polling districts ===
According to the gazette issued on 31 October 2022, the Tebedu constituency has a total of 5 polling districts.

State constituency	Polling Districts	Code	Location
Tebedu（N21）	Bentang	199/21/01	SK All St. Plaman Nyabet; SK St. John Taee; SK Parunsuan
Tebedu（N21）	Lanchang	199/21/02	SK St. Mathew Lanchang; SK St. Dominic Pichin
Tebedu（N21）	Tebedu	199/21/03	SK Tepoi; SK Temong; SK Entubuh; SK Sejijag; SK Tebedu; SK Sungan; SK Tema; SK Sg. Semaran
Tebedu（N21）	Amo	199/21/04	SK Gahat Mawang; Bangunan Kelas Tadika Bidak; SK Reteh; SK Mawang Taup; Balai Raya Kujang Sain; Balai Raya Kpg. Kujang Mawang; SK Kujang Mawang; SK Tesu; Bilik Gerakan JKKK Kpg. Daha Seroban; Balai Raya Kpg. Daga Kisau
Tebedu（N21）	Mengarat	199/21/05	SK Lobang Batu; SK Krusen

=== Representation history ===
Members of the Legislative Assembly for Tebedu
Assembly	No	Years	Member	Party
Constituency created from Tebakang and Tarat
13th	N15	1991-1996	Michael Ben Panggi	BN (PBB)
14th	N16	1996-2001	Michael Manyin Jawong	BN (PBB)
15th	N16	2001-2006	Michael Manyin Jawong	BN (PBB)
16th	N18	2006-2011	Michael Manyin Jawong	BN (PBB)
17th	N18	2011-2016	Michael Manyin Jawong	BN (PBB)
18th	N21	2016-2018	Michael Manyin Jawong	BN (PBB)
18th	N21	2018-2021	Michael Manyin Jawong	GPS (PBB)
19th	N21	2021–2026	Simon Sinang Bada	GPS (PBB)

== Election results ==
Sarawak state election, 2026
Party	Candidate	Votes	%	∆%
GPS				▲
PH				▲
Total valid votes				
Total rejected ballots				
Unreturned ballots				
Turnout				
Registered electors				
Majority				

Sarawak state election, 2021
Party	Candidate	Votes	%	∆%
GPS	Simon Sinang Bada	5,082	61.82	▲61.82
PSB	Raymond Achen Kambeng	1,809	22.00	▲22.00
PBK	Jonathan Lantik O'k	614	7.47	▲7.47
PKR	Senior William Rade	610	7.42	▼6.24
Independent	Roland Bangu	106	1.29	▲1.29
Total valid votes		8,221	100.00	
Total rejected ballots		119		
Unreturned ballots		23		
Turnout		8,363	69.46	▼6.06
Registered electors		12,040		
Majority		3,273	39.81	▼32.87
GPS gain from BN		Swing		?
Source(s) https://lom.agc.gov.my/ilims/upload/portal/akta/outputp/1718688/PUB687.pdf

Sarawak state election, 2016
Party	Candidate	Votes	%	∆%
BN	Michael Manyin Jawong	7,357	86.34	▲17.91
PKR	Alex Saben Nipong @ Nyipong	1,164	13.66	▼9.87
Total valid votes		8,521	100.00	
Total rejected ballots		144		
Unreturned ballots		36		
Turnout		8,701	75.52	▲1.75
Registered electors		11,521		
Majority		6,193	72.68	▲27.78
BN hold		Swing		
Source(s) "Federal Government Gazette - Notice of Contested Election, State Legislative Assembly of the State of Sarawak [P.U. (B) 190/2016]" (PDF). Attorney General's Chambers of Malaysia. 25 April 2016. Archived from the original (PDF) on 2017-06-12. "Senarai Calon yang Disahkan Layak Bertanding Pilihan Raya Dewan Undangan Negeri ke-11". Election Commission of Malaysia. 25 April 2016. Archived from the original on 25 April 2016.

Sarawak state election, 2011
Party	Candidate	Votes	%	∆%
BN	Michael Manyin Jawong	6,196	68.43	▼8.31
PKR	Christopher Kiyui	2,130	23.53	▲23.53
SNAP	Anthony Nais	468	5.17	▼18.09
Independent	Kipli Ale	260	2.87	▲2.87
Total valid votes		9,054	100.00	
Total rejected ballots		149		
Unreturned ballots		16		
Turnout		9,219	73.77	▲5.14
Registered electors		12,497		
Majority		4,066	44.91	▼8.58
BN hold		Swing		
Source(s) "Federal Government Gazette - Results of Contested Election and Statements of the Poll after the Official Addition of Votes Sarawak [P.U. (B) 245/2011]" (PDF). Attorney General's Chambers of Malaysia. 29 April 2011.

Sarawak state election, 2006
Party	Candidate	Votes	%	∆%
BN	Michael Manyin Jawong	6,107	76.74	▼5.34
SNAP	Peter Runin	1,851	23.26	▲23.26
Total valid votes		7,958	100.00	
Total rejected ballots		125		
Unreturned ballots		11		
Turnout		8,094	68.63	▲0.93
Registered electors		11,793		
Majority		4,256	53.48	▼10.67
BN hold		Swing		

Sarawak state election, 2001
Party	Candidate	Votes	%	∆%
BN	Michael Manyin Jawong	6,096	82.08	▲12.72
Independent	Yusuf @ Bangau Ukak	1,331	17.92	▼12.72
Total valid votes		7,427	100.00	
Total rejected ballots		192		
Unreturned ballots		11		
Turnout		7,630	67.70	▲5.74
Registered electors		11,270		
Majority		4,765	64.16	▲25.43
BN hold		Swing		

Sarawak state election, 1996
Party	Candidate	Votes	%	∆%
BN	Michael Manyin Jawong	4,585	69.36	▲19.15
Independent	Yusuf Abdullah	2,025	30.64	▲30.64
Total valid votes		6,610	100.00	
Total rejected ballots		195		
Unreturned ballots		24		
Turnout		6,829	61.96	▼12.91
Registered electors		11,022		
Majority		2,560	38.73	▲35.07
BN hold		Swing		

Sarawak state election, 1991
Party	Candidate	Votes	%
BN	Michael Ben Panggi	5,463	50.21
PBDS	Richard Riot Jaem	5,065	46.55
NEGARA	Nelson Kundai Ngarend	353	3.24
Total valid votes		10,881	100.00
Total rejected ballots		199	
Unreturned ballots		0	
Turnout		11,080	74.87
Registered electors		14,799	
Majority		398	3.66
This was a new constituency created.
