= Alfred Jabu Numpang =

Malaysian politician

Yang Berbahagia Tan Sri Datuk Patinggi Dr. Alfred Jabu Numpang PSM DP DA PNBS KMN PPC ABS

Deputy Chief Minister of Sarawak
- In office 19 September 1974 – 12 May 2016 Serving with Sim Kheng Hung (1974–1991), Dunstan Endawie Enchana (1977–1979), Daniel Tajem (1979–1986), Wong Soon Kai (1991–1996), George Chan Hong Nam (1996–2011)
- Governor: Tuanku Bujang Tuanku Othman (1974–1977); Abang Muhammad Salahuddin (1977–1981; 2001–2014); Abdul Rahman Ya'kub (1981–1985); Ahmad Zaidi Adruce (1985–2001); Abdul Taib Mahmud (2014–2016)
- Chief Minister: Abdul Rahman Ya'kub (1974–1981); Abdul Taib Mahmud (1981–2014); Adenan Satem (2014–2016)
- Preceded by: Simon Dembab Maja
- Succeeded by: Douglas Uggah Embas
- Constituency: Layar

Member of the Malaysian Parliament for Betong
- In office 14 June 1982 – 19 July 1986
- Preceded by: Wairy Leben Kato (BN–PBB)
- Succeeded by: Douglas Uggah Embas (BN–PBB)
- Majority: 1,480 (1982)

Member of the Sarawak State Legislative Assembly for Layar
- In office 1974–2016
- Preceded by: Stephen Kalong Ningkan (SNAP)
- Succeeded by: Gerald Rentap Jabu (BN–PBB)
- Majority: 504 (1974); 2,486 (1991); 4,533 (2001); 2,677 (2006); 1,916 (2011)

Personal details
- Born: 26 October 1940 (age 85) Gensurai, Betong, Raj of Sarawak (now Sarawak, Malaysia)
- Party: Parti Pesaka Bumiputera Bersatu (PBB) (1973–2016)
- Other political affiliations: Barisan Nasional (BN) (1973–2016)
- Spouse: Empiang Jabu (m. 1969)
- Children: 4 (including Gerald)
- Education: University of Canterbury

Alfred Jabu Numpang (born 26 October 1940) is a Malaysian former politician is recoginzed as the longest Deputy Chief Minister of Sarawak, having held the position for 40 years where He served as deputy to three different Sarawak Chief Ministers: Tun Abdul Rahman Ya'kub, Tun Abdul Taib Mahmud and Pehin Sri Tan Sri Adenan Satem as well as Member of the Sarawak State Legislative Assembly (MLA) for Layar from September 1974 until his retirement from politics in May 2016. He also once served as a one-term Member of Parliament for Betong from June 1982 to July 1986.

== Personal life ==
Alfred married Empiang Jabu (née Antak; born 18 February 1946) in 1969, when he was 29, whilst she was 23 years old and the couple is blessed with four children; one son and three daughters. His son, Gerald Rentap Jabu, succeeded him as Layar state assemblyman in 2016.

== Election results ==
Sarawak State Legislative Assembly
Year	Constituency	Candidate	Votes	Pct	Opponent(s)	Votes	Pct	Ballots cast	Majority	Turnout
1974	N20 Layar	Alfred Jabu Numpang (PBB)	2,851	54.85%	Stephen Kalong Ningkan (SNAP)	2,347	45.15%	5,658	504	80.32%
1979	N20 Layar	Alfred Jabu Numpang (PBB)	Unopposed							
1983	N20 Layar	Alfred Jabu Numpang (PBB)	5,053	79.21%	Razali Sabang @ Mohamed Razali (IND)	1,326	20.79%	6,455	3,727	71.65%
1987	N20 Layar	Alfred Jabu Numpang (PBB)	4,416	62.14%	David Impi (PBDS)	2,691	37.86%	7,186	1,725	76.77%
1991	N25 Layar	Alfred Jabu Numpang (PBB)	4,847	67.24%	Frank Apau (PBDS)	2,361	32.76%	7,296	2,486	75.74%
1996	N27 Layar	Alfred Jabu Numpang (PBB)	Unopposed							
2001	N27 Layar	Alfred Jabu Numpang (PBB)	5,704	80.64%	Florence Walter Samuel (IND)	1,171	16.56%	7,198	4,533	67.81%
2001	N27 Layar	Alfred Jabu Numpang (PBB)	5,704	80.64%	Danson Bulli Jelian (IND)	198	2.80%	7,198	4,533	67.81%
2006	N31 Layar	Alfred Jabu Numpang (PBB)	3,767	75.92%	Dayrell Walter Entrie (SNAP)	1,090	21.97%	5,036	2,677	67.91%
2006	N31 Layar	Alfred Jabu Numpang (PBB)	3,767	75.92%	Peter Jaban (IND)	105	2.11%	5,036	2,677	67.91%
2011	N31 Layar	Alfred Jabu Numpang (PBB)	3,703	63.37%	Stanny Embat Dharoh Laja (PKR)	1,787	30.58%	5,977	1,916	73.71%
2011	N31 Layar	Alfred Jabu Numpang (PBB)	3,703	63.37%	Joe Unggang (SNAP)	183	3.13%	5,977	1,916	73.71%
2011	N31 Layar	Alfred Jabu Numpang (PBB)	3,703	63.37%	Tedewin Ngumbang @ Kibak Datu (IND)	170	2.92%	5,977	1,916	73.71%

Parliament of Malaysia
Year	Constituency	Candidate	Votes	Pct	Opponent(s)	Votes	Pct	Ballots cast	Majority	Turnout
1982	P140 Betong	Alfred Jabu Numpang (PBB)	6,178	56.80%	David Kalom Umpie (IND)	4,698	43.20%	11,247	1,480	62.94%

== Honours ==
- Malaysia
  - Commander of the Order of Loyalty to the Crown of Malaysia (PSM) – Tan Sri (1995)
  - Officer of the Order of the Defender of the Realm (KMN) (1974)
- Sarawak
  - Knight Grand Commander of the Order of the Star of Hornbill Sarawak (DP) – Datuk Patinggi (2004)
  - Knight Commander of the Order of the Star of Hornbill Sarawak (DA) – Datuk Amar (1989)
  - Knight Commander of the Most Exalted Order of the Star of Sarawak (PNBS) – formerly Dato', now Dato Sri
  - Recipient of the Distinguished Service Medal (PPC)
  - Member of the Most Exalted Order of the Star of Sarawak (ABS)
