= Michael Manyin Jawong =

Malaysian politician (born 1944)

Yang Berbahagia Datuk Amar Michael Manyin Jawong DA PNBS PGBK AMN
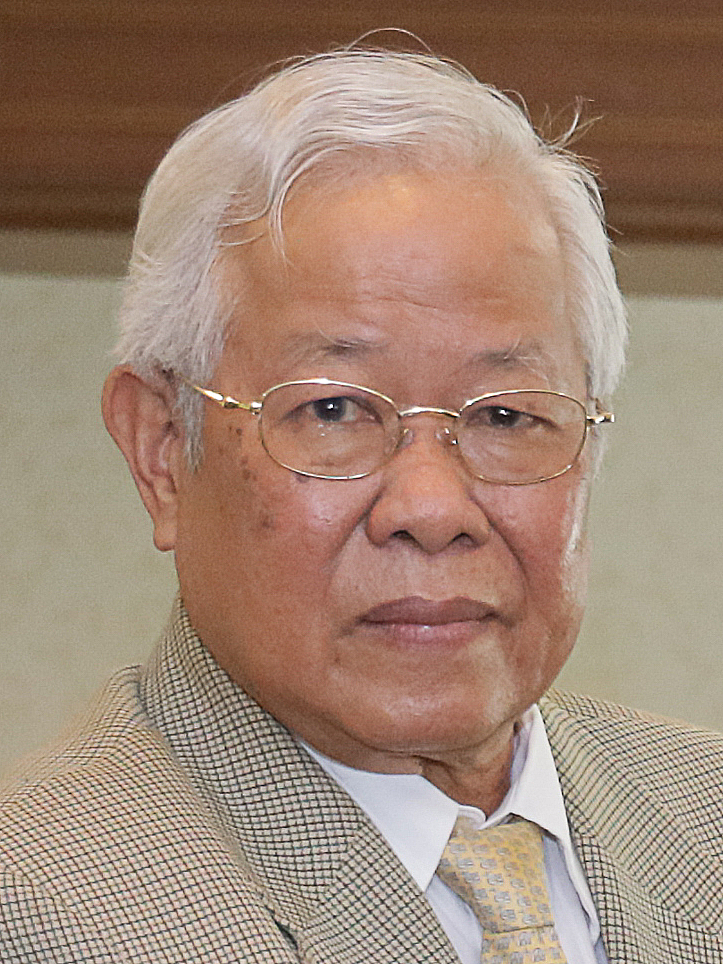
- Michael in 2020

Ministerial roles (Sarawak)
- 2016–2017: Minister of Youth, Sports and Unity
- 2017–2022: Minister of Education, Science and Technological Research

Faction represented in Sarawak State Legislative Assembly
- 1996–2018: Barisan Nasional
- 2018–2021: Gabungan Parti Sarawak

Personal details
- Born: Michael Manyin anak Jawong; 25 May 1944 (age 82) Sarawak, Japanese occupation of British Borneo
- Party: Parti Pesaka Bumiputera Bersatu (PBB)
- Other political affiliations: Barisan Nasional (until 2018); Gabungan Parti Sarawak (since 2018)
- Education: University of London (Master's)

Michael Manyin anak Jawong (born 25 May 1944) is a Malaysian politician and educator who served as the Minister of Education, Science and Technological Research of Sarawak from 2017 to 2022. A member of Parti Pesaka Bumiputera Bersatu, he represented Tebedu in Sarawak State Legislative Assembly from 1996 until his retirement in 2021.

Born in Sarawak. He was an educator before joining politics, and was the principal of Kolej DPAH Abdillah. He previously held a post of Urban Development and Tourism Minister and Sarawak Youth, Sports and Solidarity Minister. He was educated at the University of London, earning a Master's degree there in the 1970s.

== Honours ==
=== Honours of Malaysia ===
- Malaysia
  - Member of the Order of the Defender of the Realm (AMN) (1994)
- Sarawak
  - Knight Commander of the Order of the Star of Hornbill Sarawak (DA) – Datuk Amar (2020)
  - Knight Commander of the Order of the Star of Sarawak (PNBS) – Dato Sri (2009)
  - Commander of the Order of the Star of Hornbill Sarawak (PGBK) – Datuk (2002)
  - Gold Medal of the Sarawak Independence Diamond Jubilee Medal (2023)

Assembly seats
Preceded by Michael Ben Panggi	Member of Sarawak State Legislative Assembly for Tebedu; 1996–2021	Succeeded by Simon Sinang Bada
