= Layar (state constituency) =

State constituency in Sarawak, Malaysia

Layar (N36)
Sarawak constituency

State constituency
- Legislature: Sarawak State Legislative Assembly
MLA
Vacant
- Constituency created: 1968
- First contested: 1969
- Last contested: 2026

Layar is a state constituency in Sarawak, Malaysia, that has been represented in the Sarawak State Legislative Assembly since 1969.

The state constituency was created in the 1968 redistribution and is mandated to return a single member to the Sarawak State Legislative Assembly under the first past the post voting system.

== Demographics ==
Ethnic breakdown of Layar's electorate as of 2022
1. Sarawak bumiputera (71.4%)
2. Chinese (12.4%)
3. Malay-Muslim bumiputera (15.7%)
4. Other ethnicities (0.50%)

== History ==
As of 2020, Layar has a population of 12,689 people.

=== Polling districts ===
According to the gazette issued on 31 October 2022, the Layar constituency has a total of 28 polling districts.

State constituency	Polling Districts	Code	Location
Layar (N36)	Spak	204/36/01	SK Ng. Spak
Layar (N36)	Padeh	204/36/02	SK St. Bartholomew Ng. Grahu
Layar (N36)	Bebanggai	204/36/03	RH Stani Bebanggai Kanan
Layar (N36)	Betong	204/36/04	SJK (C) Chung Hua Betong
Layar (N36)	Kampung Betong	204/36/05	SK Abang Abdul Kadir
Layar (N36)	Lubau	204/36/06	RH Uking Batu Lintang
Layar (N36)	Penyalaneh	204/36/07	SK St. Mark Batu Genting
Layar (N36)	Jelau	204/36/08	RH Jawa Ng. Jelau; RH Gumbang Jelau Atas
Layar (N36)	Melanjan	204/36/09	RH Rokayah Melanjan
Layar (N36)	Tapeh	204/36/10	RH Gawan Ng Tappeh
Layar (N36)	Luing	204/36/11	SK Ng. Lawih / Lesu
Layar (N36)	Krapa	204/36/12	RH Jambai Kerapa
Layar (N36)	Teguyu	204/36/13	RH Naing Teguyu
Layar (N36)	Perdu	204/36/14	RH Brundie Batu Pesok
Layar (N36)	Dabok	204/36/15	SK Ng. Ajau
Layar (N36)	Gawis	204/36/16	SK St. Peter / St. Paul Ng. Buai
Layar (N36)	Balingam	204/36/17	RH Sang Sg. Sibau; RH John Ragai Buai Melanjan
Layar (N36)	Kron	204/36/18	RH Achong Kron
Layar (N36)	Plepok	204/36/19	RH Pagah Peleok; RH Empeni Bungkang
Layar (N36)	Merunjau	204/36/20	RH Uyok Merunjau
Layar (N36)	Entanak	204/36/21	RH Randi Entanak
Layar (N36)	Saka	204/36/22	SK Saka
Layar (N36)	Penurin	204/36/23	RH Sibat Penurin
Layar (N36)	Tanu	204/36/24	RH Teddy Lepoh Jungkal
Layar (N36)	Jugir	204/36/25	Dewan Tan Sri Jabu SMK St. Augustin Betong
Layar (N36)	Pasa	204/36/26	SK Ng. Pasa
Layar (N36)	Selulap	204/36/27	RH Spell Selulap
Layar (N36)	Stambak	204/36/28	RH Patrick Benjamin Stambak Ulu

=== Representation history ===
Members of the Legislative Assembly for Layar
Assembly	No	Years	Member	Party
Constituency created
8th	N20	1970-1974	Stephen Kalong Ningkan	SNAP
9th	N20	1974-1979	Alfred Jabu Numpang	BN (PBB)
10th	N20	1979–1983	Alfred Jabu Numpang	BN (PBB)
11th	N20	1983–1987	Alfred Jabu Numpang	BN (PBB)
12th	N20	1987–1991	Alfred Jabu Numpang	BN (PBB)
13th	N25	1991–1996	Alfred Jabu Numpang	BN (PBB)
14th	N27	1996–2001	Alfred Jabu Numpang	BN (PBB)
15th	N27	2001–2006	Alfred Jabu Numpang	BN (PBB)
16th	N31	2006–2011	Alfred Jabu Numpang	BN (PBB)
17th	N31	2011–2016	Alfred Jabu Numpang	BN (PBB)
18th	N36	2016-2018	Gerald Rentap Jabu	BN (PBB)
18th	N36	2018-2021	Gerald Rentap Jabu	GPS (PBB)
19th	N36	2021–2026	Gerald Rentap Jabu	GPS (PBB)

== Election results ==
Sarawak state election, 2026
Party	Candidate	Votes	%	∆%
GPS				▲
PH				▲
Total valid votes				
Total rejected ballots				
Unreturned ballots				
Turnout				
Registered electors				
Majority				

Sarawak state election, 2021
Party	Candidate	Votes	%	∆%
GPS	Gerald Rentap Jabu	3,891	67.75	▲67.75
PSB	Isik Utau	1,852	32.25	▲32.25
Total valid votes		5,743	100.00	
Total rejected ballots		110		
Unreturned ballots		43		
Turnout		5,896	63.17	▼9.21
Registered electors		9,334		
Majority		2,039	35.50	▲13.31
GPS gain from BN		Swing		?
Source(s) https://lom.agc.gov.my/ilims/upload/portal/akta/outputp/1718688/PUB687.pdf

Sarawak state election, 2016
Party	Candidate	Votes	%	∆%
BN	Gerald Rentap Jabu	3,931	61.10	▼2.27
PKR	Vernon Albert Kedit	2,503	38.90	▲8.32
Total valid votes		6,434	100.00	
Total rejected ballots		114		
Unreturned ballots		34		
Turnout		6,582	72.38	▼1.33
Registered electors		9,094		
Majority		1,428	22.19	▼10.61
BN hold		Swing		
Source(s) "Federal Government Gazette - Notice of Contested Election, State Legislative Assembly of the State of Sarawak [P.U. (B) 190/2016]" (PDF). Attorney General's Chambers of Malaysia. 25 April 2016. Archived from the original (PDF) on 2017-06-12. "Senarai Calon yang Disahkan Layak Bertanding Pilihan Raya Dewan Undangan Negeri ke-11". Election Commission of Malaysia. 25 April 2016. Archived from the original on 25 April 2016.

Sarawak state election, 2011
Party	Candidate	Votes	%	∆%
BN	Alfred Jabu Numpang	3,703	63.37	▼12.55
PKR	Stanny Embat Dharoh Laja	1,787	30.58	▲30.58
SNAP	Joe Unggang	183	3.13	▼18.84
Independent	Tedewin Ngumbang @ Kibak Datu	170	2.92	▲2.92
Total valid votes		5,843	100.00	
Total rejected ballots		91		
Unreturned ballots		43		
Turnout		5,977	73.71	▲5.80
Registered electors		8,109		
Majority		1,916	32.79	▼21.16
BN hold		Swing		
Source(s) "Federal Government Gazette - Results of Contested Election and Statements of the Poll after the Official Addition of Votes Sarawak [P.U. (B) 245/2011]" (PDF). Attorney General's Chambers of Malaysia. 29 April 2011.

Sarawak state election, 2006
Party	Candidate	Votes	%	∆%
BN	Alfred Jabu Numpang	3,767	75.92	▼4.72
SNAP	Dayrell Walter Entrie	1,090	21.97	▲21.97
Independent	Peter Jaban	105	2.11	▲2.11
Total valid votes		4,962	100.00	
Total rejected ballots		64		
Unreturned ballots		10		
Turnout		5,036	67.91	▲0.10
Registered electors		7,415		
Majority		2,677	53.95	▼10.14
BN hold		Swing		

Sarawak state election, 2001
Party	Candidate	Votes	%	∆%
BN	Alfred Jabu Numpang	5,704	80.64	▲80.64
Independent	Florence Walter Samuel	1,171	16.56	▲16.56
Independent	Danson Bulli Jelian	198	2.80	▲2.80
Total valid votes		7,073	100.00	
Total rejected ballots		115		
Unreturned ballots		10		
Turnout		7,198	67.81	
Registered electors		10,615		
Majority		4,533	64.09	
BN hold		Swing		

Sarawak state election, 1996
Party	Candidate	Votes	%	∆%
On the nomination day, Alfred Jabu Numpang won uncontested.
BN	Alfred Jabu Numpang			
Total valid votes			100.00	
Total rejected ballots				
Unreturned ballots				
Turnout				
Registered electors		10,636		
Majority				
BN hold		Swing		

Sarawak state election, 1991
Party	Candidate	Votes	%	∆%
BN	Alfred Jabu Numpang	4,847	67.24	▲5.09
PBDS	Frank Apau	2,361	32.76	▼5.09
Total valid votes		7,208	100.00	
Total rejected ballots		73		
Unreturned ballots		15		
Turnout		7,296	75.74	▲0.91
Registered electors		9,633		
Majority		2,486	34.49	▲10.22
BN hold		Swing		

Sarawak state election, 1987
Party	Candidate	Votes	%	∆%
BN	Alfred Jabu Numpang	4,416	62.14	▼17.06
PBDS	David Impi	2,691	37.86	▲16.86
Total valid votes		7,107	100.00	
Total rejected ballots		79		
Unreturned ballots		0		
Turnout		7,186	74.61	▲2.77
Registered electors		9,631		
Majority		1,725	24.27	▼34.16
BN hold		Swing		

Sarawak state election, 1983
Party	Candidate	Votes	%	∆%
BN	Alfred Jabu Numpang	5,053	79.21	▲79.21
Independent	Mohamad Razali Sabang	1,326	20.79	▲20.79
Total valid votes		6,379	100.00	
Total rejected ballots		76		
Unreturned ballots		0		
Turnout		6,455	71.65	
Registered electors		9,009		
Majority		3,727	58.43	
BN hold		Swing		

Sarawak state election, 1979
Party	Candidate	Votes	%	∆%
On the nomination day, Alfred Jabu Numpang won uncontested.
BN	Alfred Jabu Numpang			
Total valid votes			100.00	
Total rejected ballots				
Unreturned ballots				
Turnout				
Registered electors		7,751		
Majority				
BN hold		Swing		

Sarawak state election, 1974
Party	Candidate	Votes	%	∆%
BN	Alfred Jabu Numpang	2,851	54.85	▼0.20
SNAP	Stephen Kalong Ningkan	2,347	45.15	▼9.90
Total valid votes		5,198	100.00	
Total rejected ballots		460		
Unreturned ballots		0		
Turnout		5,658	80.32	▲2.95
Registered electors		7,044		
Majority		504	9.70	▼20.33
BN gain from SNAP		Swing		?

Sarawak state election, 1969
Party	Candidate	Votes	%
SNAP	Stephen Kalong Ningkan	2,546	55.05
Independent	Charles H. Ingka	1,157	25.02
PESAKA	Edmun Derom	713	15.42
Independent	Juing Insoll	209	4.52
Total valid votes		4,625	100.00
Total rejected ballots		381	
Unreturned ballots		0	
Turnout		5,006	77.37
Registered electors		6,470	
Majority		1,389	30.03
This was a new constituency created.
