= Chong Siew Fai =

Malaysian judge and lawyer

Yang Amat Arif Tan Sri Datuk Amar Chong Siew Fai PSM DA PNBS
- 張守輝

2nd Chief Judge of Sabah and Sarawak
- In office 16 June 1995 – 3 July 2000
- Nominated by: Mahathir Mohamad
- Appointed by: Ja'afar
- Preceded by: Mohamad Jemuri Serjan
- Succeeded by: Steve Shim Lip Kiong

Personal details
- Born: Chong Siew Fai; 4 January 1935 Sarikei, Sarikei Division, Raj of Sarawak (now Sarawak, Malaysia)
- Died: 23 January 2006 (aged 71) Kuching, Kuching Division, Sarawak, Malaysia
- Resting place: Nirvana Memorial Park, Bau, Kuching Division, Sarawak, Malaysia
- Citizenship: Malaysian
- Spouse: Rosalind T'en Yaw Hee (m. 1968)
- Relations: Chong Siew Chiang (brother); Chong Chieng Jen (nephew)
- Education: Lincoln's Inn
- Occupation: Teacher; Judge
- Profession: Barrister

Tan Sri Datuk Amar Chong Siew Fai (simplified Chinese: 张守辉; traditional Chinese: 張守輝; pinyin: Zhāng Shǒu?; Jyutping: Zoeng1 Sau2?; Pe̍h-ōe-jī: Tiuⁿ Siú?; Born 4 January 1935) was a Malaysian barrister and judge who served as the second Chief Judge of Sabah and Sarawak.

== Early life and education ==
Chong was born in Sarikei in the then-British protectorate state of Raj of Sarawak to a couple who were owners of a Chinese drugstore. The eldest of seven siblings, he completed his high school education at St. Anthony's National Secondary School in his hometown and later also attended St. Joseph's National Secondary School in Kuching. After his father had fallen ill, Chong returned home to take over the helm at the family business after having only completed Form 3 (Year 10) of his high school. Nevertheless, he self-studied and eventually took teaching jobs at his alma mater, St. Anthony's, including teaching Form 4 and 5 (Years 11 and 12) morning classes between 1952 and 1962.

On 27 September 1962, Chong, aged 27, used his savings from his teaching days to pay for his ship ticket to London, United Kingdom to begin his studies after being accepted into Lincoln's Inn. Working tirelessly, he finished his studies in 18 months compared to the usual three years. Upon completion of his studies and admission to the English Bar in February 1965, Chong would return home to practice and eventually founded the law firm "Chong Brothers Advocates" in 1968 alongside his younger brother, Chong Siew Chiang.

== Career ==
=== Advocates' Association of Sarawak ===
In May 1965, he was called to the Advocates' Association of Sarawak (Sarawak Bar) and practised law at "Messrs. Yong & Co." until December 1967. After around seven years since the foundation of his legal firm, Chong was elected President of the Advocates' Association of Sarawak. He held this position between 1975 and 1979. During this time, he was appointed Commissioner for Oaths (August 1978) and later Notary public (October 1978).

=== Judicial ===
Immediately after his tenure ended, Chong was appointed a judge of the High Court of Malaysia. For the following 14 years, he would serve in this capacity at various cities around the country where the High Courts were found, including Kuching, Kota Kinabalu and Sibu. In 1994, Chong was elevated to serve in the Federal Court of Malaysia, the apex court in Malaysia. Shortly after his promotion, Chong was appointed as the new Chief Judge of Sabah and Sarawak in 1995, thus ascending to the nation's fourth highest judicial office after the Chief Justice of Malaysia, President of the Court of Appeal of Malaysia and Chief Judge of Malaya. Simultaneously, he was also appointed a judge of the Special Court of Malaysia. He served in this office between June 1995 and July 2000 before retiring.

=== Other positions ===
- Chairman of Ku Seng Association, Sarawak (January 1975 to January 1980)
- Vice Chairman of the Hakka Association, Kuching (January 1979 to January 1980)
- Deputy Secretary-General of the Federation of the 1st Division Chinese Associations, Sarawak (November 1979 to January 1980)

== Honours ==
- Malaysia
  - Commander of the Order of Loyalty to the Crown of Malaysia (PSM) – Tan Sri (1999)
- Sarawak
  - Knight Commander of the Order of the Star of Sarawak (PNBS) – Dato Sri
  - Knight Commander of the Order of the Star of Hornbill Sarawak (DA) – Datuk Amar (1999)

== Personal life ==
Chong was a Malaysian Chinese of Hakka descent. He was married to Puan Sri Datin Amar Rosalind T'en Yaw Hee on 2 October 1968, together, they have one son and three daughters. Chong's nephew and son of Chong Siew Chiang, Chong Chieng Jen, is the current Deputy Minister of Domestic Trade and Consumer Affairs of Malaysia and Member of Parliament (MP) for Stampin.

- Chairman of Matrix International Berhad (January 2003 to January 2006)

== Death ==
Chong died on 23 January 2006 at his home in Kuching having suffered from colon cancer for the previous 18 months.

Legal offices
Preceded by Mohamad Jemuri Serjan	Chief Judge of Sabah and Sarawak; 1995–2000	Succeeded by Steve Shim Lip Kiong
