= Ismail Khan Ibrahim Khan =

Malaysian barrister and judge

Yang Amat Arif Tan Sri Dato' Ismail Khan Ibrahim Khan PMN PSM PPT BKT
- إسماعيل خان بن إبراهيم خان

6th President of the Dewan Negara
- In office 31 December 1980 – 13 April 1985
- Appointed by: Ahmad Shah
- Deputy: Abdul Hamid Bidin (1981-1982); Sulaiman Ninam Shah (1982-1985)
- Preceded by: Omar Ong Yoke Lin
- Succeeded by: Benedict Stephens

3rd Chief Justice of Borneo
- In office 2 September 1968 – 31 December 1973
- Nominated by: Tunku Abdul Rahman
- Appointed by: Ismail Nasiruddin
- Preceded by: Sir Philip Ernest Housden Pike QC
- Succeeded by: Lee Hun Hoe

Personal details
- Born: Ismail Khan bin Ibrahim Khan; 18 June 1905 Taiping, Perak, Federated Malay States (now Malaysia)
- Died: 18 April 2000 (aged 94) Seremban, Seremban District, Negeri Sembilan, Malaysia
- Resting place: Taiping Old Mosque, Taiping, Larut district, Perak, Malaysia
- Citizenship: Malaysian
- Education: University College, London; Middle Temple
- Occupation: Judge
- Profession: Barrister

Ismail Khan bin Ibrahim Khan (18 June 1905 – 18 April 2000; Jawi: إسماعيل خان بن إبراهيم خان) was a Malaysian barrister and judge who served as the third Chief Justice of Borneo. He was the first Malay law graduate and second to become a barrister. Khan later came out of retirement after being nominated as President of the Dewan Negara (President of the Senate of Malaysia).

== Early life and education ==
Khan attended the premier boys' high school, King Edward VII School, and later the St. George's Institution where he matriculated in January 1923. Upon matriculation, Khan enrolled in the King Edward VII College of Medicine in Singapore to study medicine only to change his mind and left for University College, London in June the same year to read law instead. After four years in June 1927, Khan graduated and was called to the English Bar by Middle Temple in January 1928.

== Career ==
After returning to British Malaya, Khan practised at a law firm in Penang of the Straits Settlements until the Japanese occupation of Malaya. In the aftermath of the war, he resumed his practice at Alor Setar, Kedah before being elevated to the bench. In 1958, Khan was appointed a judge of the Supreme Court of Malaysia (then Federation of Malaya) and was based in the capital, Kuala Lumpur. As Supreme Court judge, he was also later posted to the states of Negeri Sembilan and Malacca. Ten years after elevation to the bench, Khan was appointed the Chief Justice of Borneo on 2 September 1968, an office which he held until his retirement on 31 December 1973. He was the first non-British Empire citizen and only one of two non-East Malaysians to date to be appointed to the office.

In December 1980, Khan came out of retirement after government decided to nominate him as the next President of the Senate of Malaysia. He served as the sixth president for more than four years before retiring a second time in July 1985.

== Honours ==
- Malaysia
  - Commander of the Order of Loyalty to the Crown of Malaysia (PSM) - Tan Sri (1969)
  - Commander of the Order of the Defender of the Realm (PMN) - Tan Sri (1984)
- Malacca
  - Commendable Service Star (BKT)
- Sarawak
  - Commendable Service Medal – Bronze (PPT)

Political offices
Preceded by Omar Ong Yoke Lin	President of the Dewan Negara; 1980–1985	Succeeded by Benedict Stephens
Legal offices
Preceded by Sir Philip Ernest Housden Pike	Chief Justice of Borneo; 1968–1973	Succeeded by Lee Hun Hoe
