= Ivor Brace =

British barrister and judge

Sir Ivor Brace

1st Chief Justice of the Combined Judiciary of Sarawak, North Borneo and Brunei
- In office 1 December 1951 – 24 October 1952
- Nominated by: Sir Winston Churchill
- Appointed by: George VI
- Preceded by: Robert Yorke Hedges
- Succeeded by: Sir Ernest Hillas Williams

2nd Chief Justice of North Borneo
- In office 1945 – 30 November 1951
- Nominated by: Clement Attlee
- Appointed by: George VI
- Preceded by: Charles Frederick Cunningham Macaskie
- Succeeded by: Office abolished

Personal details
- Born: Ivor Llewellyn Brace; September 1898 Abertillery, Gwent, Wales, United Kingdom
- Died: 24 October 1952 (aged 54) Singapore General Hospital, Colony of Singapore
- Citizenship: British
- Parent(s): William Brace PC (Father); Nellie Humphreys (Mother)
- Education: University College of South Wales and Monmouthshire; London University
- Occupation: Judge
- Profession: Barrister

Military service
- Allegiance: United Kingdom
- Branch/service: British Army
- Years of service: 1916–1919
- Rank: Lieutenant
- Unit: Royal Welch Fusiliers; Welch Regiment
- Battles/wars: World War I

Sir Ivor Llewellyn Brace (September 1898 – 24 October 1952) was a Welsh soldier and barrister who later served as a colonial judge. In 1951, he became the first Chief Justice of the Combined Judiciary of Sarawak, North Borneo and Brunei. He served in this position until his death.

== Career ==
Ivor was called to the Bar in England and Wales in 1921 and practised on the South Wales circuit. His first appointment with the Colonial Legal Service was as magistrate in the Gold Coast. In 1932, Ivor was Crown Counsel in Colonial Nigeria. He later served as assistant judge at the Nigerian High Court before being transferred to Sierra Leone Colony and Protectorate to serve as puisne judge.

In 1946, Ivor left for British Borneo after being appointed Chief Justice of North Borneo and subsequently became the first Chief Justice of the Combined Judiciary of Sarawak, North Borneo and Brunei in December 1951. He was knighted in the 1952 New Year Honours.

== Personal life ==
Brace was the younger of two sons of William Brace and Nellie Humphreys.

== Honours ==
- United Kingdom :
  - Knight Bachelor (Kt) - Sir (1952)

Legal offices
New creation	Chief Justice of the Combined Judiciary of Sarawak, North Borneo and Brunei; 1951–1952	Succeeded by Sir Ernest Hillas Williams
Preceded by Charles Frederick Cunningham Macaskie	Chief Justice of North Borneo; 1945–1951	Merged with office of Chief Justice of Sarawak to form Chief Justice of the Combined Judiciary of Sarawak, North Borneo and Brunei
