= Robert Yorke Hedges =

British expatriate judge

The Right Honourable Robert Yorke Hedges

3rd Chief Justice of Sarawak
- In office 1946–1951
- Nominated by: Clement Attlee
- Appointed by: George VI
- Preceded by: H. Thackwell-Lewis
- Succeeded by: Sir Ivor Llewellyn Brace

Personal details
- Born: Robert Yorke Hedges; 6 August 1903 Colonial Nigeria
- Died: 26 May 1963 (aged 59)
- Citizenship: British
- Education: Victoria University of Manchester; Harvard University; Gray's Inn
- Occupation: Lecturer; Judge
- Profession: Lawyer

Robert Yorke Hedges (1903–1963) was a British expatriate judge who was Chief Justice of Sarawak from 1946 to 1951.

Hedges was born on 6 August 1903. He was educated at Central High School then Victoria University of Manchester and completed his studies with Bachelor of Laws, Between 1926 and 1927, he studied at Harvard then went to Geneva, where he obtained Diplôme de Hautes Études Internationales from the Geneva Graduate Institute. He also obtained LL.M and LL.D. by Manchester University.

After completing his studies, Hedges worked as a law lecturer at Manchester University, in May 1936, he moved to Brisbane to continue teaching and was engaged as the dean of the newly established University of Queensland Law School. He was admitted into the Queensland bar, but his application for silk was rejected by reason of limited practice. During World War II, he was worked for the British Army stationed in Australia, and in 1945 he was appointed legal staff officer in the military administration in British Borneo. Hedges was Chief Justice of Sarawak from 1946 to 1951. In 1956, Hedges was nominated to become a judge at the Supreme Court of Nigeria.

Legal offices
Preceded by H. Thackwell-Lewis	Chief Justice of Sarawak; 1946–1951	Succeeded by Sir Ivor Llewellyn Brace
