= Philip Pike =

Jamaican barrister (1914–2011)

The Right Honourable Tan Sri Sir Philip Ernest Housden Pike PMN(K) QC

2nd Chief Justice of Borneo
- In office 11 September 1965 – 27 August 1968
- Nominated by: Harold Wilson
- Appointed by: Elizabeth II
- Preceded by: Sir William Campbell Wylie
- Succeeded by: Ismail Khan Ibrahim Khan

Personal details
- Born: 6 March 1914 Colony of Jamaica
- Died: 20 March 2011 (aged 97)
- Citizenship: British citizenship
- Education: Middle Temple
- Occupation: Judge
- Profession: Barrister

Tan Sri Sir Philip Ernest Housden Pike, PMN(K), QC (6 March 1914 – 20 March 2011) was a Jamaican barrister and judge who served as the second Chief Justice of Borneo, and later Chief Justice of Malawi and Chief Justice of Swaziland.

== Early life and education ==
Pike was born in the Colony of Jamaica on 6 March 1914. He attended the local De Carteret School and Munro College. At the age of 24, he was called to the English Bar by Middle Temple on 29 June 1938.

== Career ==
Pike's first appointment came on 22 May 1949 when he was appointed as a legal draftsman of the Kenya Colony. On 15 January 1950, he was officially appointed acting Solicitor-General in addition to his duties as legal draftsman. He would assume the same acting duties again beginning 11 April 1951. Pike served in this office until the 5 May 1952.

After leaving Kenya, Pike was next assigned to the Uganda Protectorate. On 1 February 1954, he was appointed as one of the members of the Uganda Legislative Council.

In 1958, Pike was assigned to the Crown Colony of Sarawak to serve as its Attorney-General. Later in September 1965, he was elevated as Chief Justice of Borneo, an office he held until his retirement in August 1968.

Pike was appointed acting Chief Justice of Malawi in 1969, and then Chief Justice of Swaziland from 1970 to 1972.

== Personal life and death ==
Pike died on 20 March 2011, at the age of 97.

== Honours ==
- Malaysia:
  - Honorary Commander of the Order of the Defender of the Realm (PMN (K)) - Tan Sri (1968)
- United Kingdom:
  - Knight Bachelor (Kt) - Sir (1969)

Legal offices
Preceded by Sir William Campbell Wylie	Chief Justice of Borneo; 1965–1968	Succeeded by Ismail Khan Ibrahim Khan
