= Charles Macaskie =

English barrister and judge

Brigadier Charles Macaskie CMG
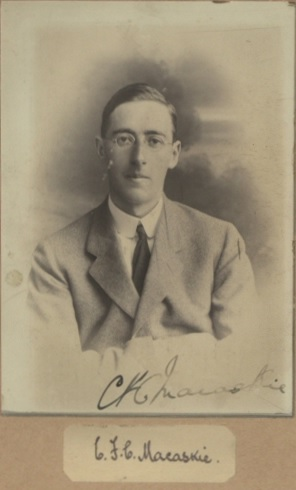

Chief Justice of North Borneo
- In office 1934–1945
- Nominated by: Ramsay MacDonald
- Appointed by: George V
- Preceded by: Office established
- Succeeded by: Sir Ivor Llewellyn Brace

Chief Civil Affairs Officer of Borneo
- In office 12 September 1945 – 1 July 1946
- Governor: Charles Robert Smith
- Preceded by: Japanese surrender
- Succeeded by: end of military governance

Personal details
- Born: Charles Frederick Cunningham Macaskie; 26 March 1888 Leeds, West Riding of Yorkshire, England
- Died: 26 November 1969 (aged 81) Melbourne, Victoria, Australia
- Citizenship: British
- Spouse(s): Maggie Winifred Mary Bruce (m. 1918; div. 1926) Doris Legg (m. 1946)
- Children: Ian Bruce Macaskie
- Parent(s): Charles Frederick Cunningham Macaskie (Father); Mary Calthorpe Emslie (Mother)
- Education: Gray's Inn
- Profession: Barrister

Military service
- Allegiance: United Kingdom
- Branch/service: British Army
- Rank: Brigadier
- Unit: Royal West Kent Regiment
- Battles/wars: World War I

Brigadier Charles Frederick Cunningham Macaskie CMG (26 March 1888 – 26 November 1969) was an English barrister who served as the first Chief Justice of North Borneo.

== Career ==
In 1910, Macaskie had remained in the British protectorate of North Borneo after the First World War ended to work as a British government official. Between 1934 and 1945, he served as the Chief Justice and Deputy Governor of North Borneo. After the Japanese occupation of British Borneo, Macaskie returned and was appointed chief civil affairs officer for the period 1945-1946 and was later made commissioner for war damage claims for the Borneo Territories between 1947 and 1951.

After he left North Borneo, Macaskie held the position of acting British judge at New Hebrides (now Vanuatu) in 1955, 1958 and 1959.

== Personal life ==
Macaskie' first marriage was to Maggie Winifred Mary Macaskie (née Bruce), who bore him a son in 1919, Ian Bruce Macaskie. Due to Macaskie' frequent work travels into the interior region of Borneo, his family was often left alone in the capital Jesselton. In 1922, his wife fell pregnant with a Scottish man's child. Macaskie sent the family back to England to allow Maggie to give birth in more hospitable conditions and agreed to be listed as the child's father. Later, during one of Macaskie' trip back to Kent, the couple agreed to officially separate and eventually divorced in 1926.

In 1946, Macaskie married Doris Cole-Adams (née Legg).

== Honours ==
- United Kingdom :
  - Companion of the Order of St Michael and St George (CMG) (1946)

== See also ==
- Chief Judge of Sabah and Sarawak
- Governor of North Borneo
- North Borneo dispute

Legal offices
New creation	Chief Justice of North Borneo; 1934–1945	Succeeded by Sir Ivor Llewellyn Brace
