= Order of the Star of Hornbill Sarawak =

State decoration of Sarawak, Malaysia

The Most Illustrious Order of the Star of Sarawak Darjah Yang Amat Mulia Bintang Kenyalang Sarawak

Awarded by the Yang di-Pertua Negeri of Sarawak
- Type: Order of merit
- Motto: Bersatu Berusaha Berbakti ("United, Striving, Serving")
- Eligibility: Malaysians and foreigners
- Awarded for: distinguished services to the state of Sarawak
- Status: Currently constituted
- Grand Master: Tun Pehin Sri Wan Junaidi Tuanku Jaafar
- Grades: Knight Grand Commander; Knight Commander; Commander; Companion; Officer; Member
- Post-nominals: D.P.; D.A.; P.G.B.K.; J.B.K.; P.B.K.; A.B.K.

Statistics
- Total inductees: 327 (living recipients at one time only)

Precedence
- Next (higher): Most Exalted Order of the Star of Sarawak
- Next (lower): Order of Meritorious Service to Sarawak

The Darjah Yang Amat Mulia Bintang Kenyalang Sarawak (Order of the Star of the Hornbill of Sarawak) is the second highest order group (in the group of orders) of the orders, decorations, and medals of Sarawak. The order was instituted in 1970, and was redesigned in 1988. Two more ranks were added to the order: the 'Officer' in 1988 and the 'Companion' in 2002.

The order is divided into six classes:

Order	Post Nominal	Title	Created	Changed	Number of Living Recipients (at one time)	Photo
Datuk Patinggi Bintang Kenyalang (Knight Grand Commander)	D.P.	Datuk Patinggi	1970	1988	20	1
Datuk Amar Bintang Kenyalang (Knight Commander)	D.A.	Datuk Amar	1973	1988	27	2
Panglima Gemilang Bintang Kenyalang (Commander)	P.G.B.K.	Datuk	1973	1988	130	3
Johan Bintang Kenyalang (Companion)	J.B.K.	None	1973	1988	150	4
Pegawai Bintang Kenyalang (Officer)	P.B.K.	None	2002	None	Unlimited	5
Ahli Bintang Kenyalang (Member)	A.B.K.	None	1988	None	Unlimited	6

Ribbon bars
Datuk Patinggi (D.P.)	Datuk Amar (D.A.)	Panglima Gemilang (P.G.B.K.)	Johan (J.B.K.)	Pegawai (P.B.K.)	Ahli (A.B.K.)
Ribbon patterns
Ribbon patterns (1970 or 1973 to 1988)

== Nomination criteria ==
=== Panglima Gemilang Bintang Kenyalang (P.G.B.K.) ===
Especially designated for men and women who rendered excellent service to the State of Sarawak for a long period of time and has strong influence with the highest display of responsibility befitting their station.

=== Johan Bintang Kenyalang (J.B.K.) ===
Bestowed to men and women with high standing and provided an honourable service to the State of Sarawak in their respective fields. In order to qualify, the nominees display a strong influence in the field they are active in, and where it is exercised for the good of all. Within the civil service, those who are at Premiere Grade "C" or Special Grade "C" or those in the Top Management Group (Kumpulan Pengurusan Tertinggi) or its equivalent.

=== Pegawai Bintang Kenyalang (P.B.K.) ===
An award for those with high position in their service to the State of Sarawak where although it may not be as outstanding as required for the second grade, but may be deemed as special, for instance the discharge of a special function or responsibility successfully over a span of several years. Those in the Civil Service's Professional and Management Group or higher, including the Assistant Commissioner of Police, Colonel in the Army, Captain in the Air Force, and Captain in the Navy, qualify to be nominated.

=== Ahli Bintang Kenyalang (A.B.K.) ===
For service and contribution of high esteem suitable with their position or roles. Nominees from the Civil Service belong to the Support Group or higher, including Assistant Superintendent of Police, Major in the Army, Squadron Leader in the Air Force, and Lieutenant Commander in the Navy.

== Recipients ==
=== Knight Grand Commander (D.P.) ===
Bestows upon its recipients the title Datuk Patinggi. Wives of the award holder are styled Datin Patinggi while husbands do not receive a courtesy title.

- 1974: Abdul Rahman Ya'kub
- 1980: Mahathir Mohamad
- 1981: Abdul Taib Mahmud
- 1986: Leonardus Benyamin Moerdani (Honorary)
- 1988: Hajah Rosmiati
- 1997: Wong Soon Kai
- 2003: Abdullah Ahmad Badawi
- 2003: Hajah Norkiah
- 2004: Alfred Jabu Numpang
- 2005: George Chan Hong Nam
- 2008: Najib Razak
- 2009: Tunku Ibrahim Ismail Sultan Iskandar
- 2009: Laila Taib (posthumous)
- 2013: Muhyiddin Yassin
- 2014: Adenan Satem
- 2015: Ragad Kurdi Taib
- 2016: Ahmad Zahid Hamidi
- 2017: Abang Johari Tun Abang Haji Openg
- 2022: Ismail Sabri Yaakob
- 2024: Fauziah Mohd Sanusi
- 2024: Leonard Linggi Jugah

=== Knight Commander (D.A.) ===
Bestows upon its recipients the title Datuk Amar. Wives of the award holder are styled Datin Amar, while the recipient's husbands do not receive a courtesy title.

- 1981: Stephen Yong Kuet Tze
- 1982: Mohamed Yaacob
- 1985: James Wong Kim Min
- 1986: Bujang Mohd Nor
- 1987: Leonard Linggi Jugah
- 1988: Lee Hun Hoe
- 1988: Laila Taib
- 1988: Stephen Kalong Ningkan
- 1988: Ghazali Shafie
- 1988: Abdul Rahim Thamby Chik
- 1989: Alfred Jabu Numpang
- 1989: Wong Soon Kai
- 1991: Sulaiman Daud
- 1992: Mohd Jemuri Serjan
- 1993: Hamid Bugo
- 1993: Mohammed Hanif Omar
- 1993: Wee Boon Ping
- 1994: Permaisuri Siti Aishah
- 1996: Lim Chong Eu
- 1998: George Chan Hong Nam
- 1999: Chong Siew Fai
- 1999: Leo Moggie anak Irok
- 1999: Osu Sukam
- 2001: Abdul Aziz Husain
- 2002: Steve Shim Lip Kiong
- 2004: Musa Aman
- 2005: H.C. Lothar Spath
- 2007: Datu Wilson Baya Dandot
- 2008: Jeanne Abdullah
- 2008: Abang Johari
- 2008: Awang Tengah Ali Hasan
- 2008: P. Ramlee (posthumous)
- 2009: Mohamad Morshidi Abdul Ghani
- 2009: Adenan Satem
- 2010: Rosmah Mansor
- 2011: Mohamad Asfia Awang Nassar
- 2012: Mohd Ghazali Mohd Seth
- 2012: Abdul Hamed Sepawi
- 2013: James Jemut Masing
- 2013: Douglas Uggah Embas
- 2014: Yaw Teck Seng
- 2016: Md Raus Sharif
- 2016: Jamilah Anu
- 2018: Juma'ani Tuanku Haji Bujang
- 2018: Alli Kawi (posthumous)
- 2019: Jaul Samion
- 2019: Ahmad Tarmizi Sulaiman
- 2019: Dominic Andrew Dago @ Dagok anak Randan
- 2020: Michael Manyin Jawong
- 2020: Mohd Zuki Ali
- 2020: Mohammad Ali Mahmud
- 2021: Abang Ahmad Urai
- 2021: Pengiran Hipni Pengiran Anu (posthumous)
- 2022: Abang Iskandar Abang Hashim
- 2022: Mohamad Abu Bakar Marzuki
- 2023: Sim Kui Hian
- 2025: Fadillah Yusof
- Sim Kheng Hong
- Pengiran Isteri Hajjah Mariam
- Ong Kee Hui
- Tunku Abdul Malik

=== Commander (P.G.B.K.) ===
Bestows upon its recipients the title Datuk. Wives of the recipient are styled Datin, whereas their husbands do not have a courtesy title.

- 1990: Yaw Teck Seng
- 1998: Peter Chin Fah Kui
- 2004: Mohammad Tufail Mahmud
- 2004: Zainal Abdin Ahmad
- 2009: Bolhassan Di
- 2009: Hamden Ahmad
- 2009: Bolly Lapok
- 2010: Khairuddin Ab Hamid
- 2010: Fadillah Yusof
- 2010: Abang Abdul Rauf Abang Haji Zen
- 2011: Fatimah Abdullah
- 2011: Sylvester Entri Muran
- 2011: Mohd Naroden Majais
- 2011: Mong Dagang
- 2011: Abdul Wahab Aziz
- 2011: Roland Sagah Wee Inn
- 2011: Mazelan Kasap
- 2011: Stephen Mundaw
- 2011: Temenggong Kanang Langkau
- 2014: Ling Suk Kiong
- 2016: Nancy Shukri
- 2017: Snowdan Lawan
- 2017: Talat Mahmood Abdul Rashid
- 2017: Mohamad Kadim Suadi
- 2017: Abdul Ajis Abdul Majeed
- 2017: Awang Bulgiba Awang Mahmud
- 2018: Robert Lawson Chuat Vincent Entering
- 2018: Abdul Rahman Junaidi
- 2018: Abdullah Abdul Rahim
- 2018: Hii Teck Yun

=== Companion (J.B.K.) ===
- Datuk Dr Ahmad Ridzwan Arshad - 2004
- Kasjoo Kadis - 2004
- Lim Kian Hock - 2004
- Datin Napsiah Mahfoz - 2004
- Prof Dr. Khairuddin Abdul Hamid - 2004
- Francis Johen Adam, Acting Deputy State Attorney General - 2009
- Ubaidillah Abdul Latip, Permanent Secretary, State Ministry of Public Utilities - 2009
- Prof Helmut Lueckenhausen - 2011
- Pandalela Rinong, National Diver & Olympic Medalist - 2012
- Izyan Alirahman, also known as Zee Avi, musician - 2012
- Mohd Hafiz Mohd Suip, recording artist - 2012
- Jerry Kamit, sape player - 2012
- Muhamad Haneef Ali - 2016

=== Officer (P.B.K.) ===
1. Florence Anak David Brown
2. Syed Mohamad Fauzi Shahab
3. Matthew Chin Hiong Choi
4. Saniah Abdul Kadir
5. Ivy Lim Chen Chen
6. Sapiah Daud
7. John Awan
8. Abg Borhanudin Abg Ahmad Masuine
9. Ahmad Sukarno Saini
10. Happysupina Sait
11. Mohizah Mohamad
12. Rusmaliza Mat Darus
13. Siti Nirainawati Aini
14. Wisil Lichok
15. Jamey Mijek
16. Noor Salmah Reduan
17. Christopher Danan Binjie
18. Abang Jamallidon Abang Ullie
19. Enting @ Inting Nyami
20. Abg Mohamed Abg Turkey
21. Sebi Abang
22. Abdul Khalid Manap
23. Lim Hock Meng
24. Suhaili Mohamed
25. Elsie William
26. Jamalie Busri
27. Alfred Geling Ason
28. Andrew Gumbak
29. Engkamat Lading
30. Dr Cheong Yaw Liang
31. Timothy Alexander
32. LT. Kolonel Zainal Azli Ismail
33. Dayang Rahanah Awang Mashor
34. Law Poh Kiong
35. Rawa Nau
36. Ali Suhaili
37. Fathi Mursidi
38. Dayang Rozana Abang Hassan
39. Bernard Sia Siew Fang
40. Ismail Ibrahim
41. Philip Sangkan
42. Alexson Naga Chabu
43. Roselina Daud
44. Zulfikar Mohd Ghazali
45. Leftenan Kolonel Hanable Sunday Edward
46. Azlan Ramli
47. Dr Firdaus Abdullah @ Kenneth Kevin Akeu
48. Abdul Malik Abdullah @ Hin Langit
49. Joel @ Berinau Bangin
50. Japri Bujang Masli
51. Louis Simon Peter
52. Gabriel Bain Gonyep
53. Alli Matsah
54. Ghani Abone @ Marnie Abon
55. Roshidi Junai
56. Lau Oi Phen
57. Lau Hieng Wuong
58. Thomas Jawa Lasu
59. Peter @ Peter Lai Sakul
60. Haminah Tan
61. Durie Augustine Tinggie
62. Nicholas Amin
63. Kuek Eng Mong
64. Datin Seri Baduyah Bujang
65. Sim Soon Tian
66. Hii Sieh Toh
67. Rasiah Ali @ Rosiah Ali
68. Henry Colin Belawing
69. Yeo Liew Yian
70. Margaret Philip Bedus
71. Iskandar Sharkawi
72. Han Hipeni
73. Jong Yee Kie
74. Chambai Lindong
75. Dajai Anggie
76. Guan @ Franklin Guang Juma
77. Horaira @ Horairah Hanapi
78. Jamaiyah Sulaiman
79. Jamilah Rakim
80. Jawan Nyaun
81. Jenny Jita Eyir
82. Juliana Usun Kalang
83. Natasha Nasa Douglas Uggah
84. Rosita Poni
85. Thomas Lamit Lutik
86. Alyik Manding
87. Florince Christy
88. Hillary Mawan Antar
89. James Mering Imang
90. Kayak @ Philip Brandah
91. Kiew Shyn Yong
92. Musin Radin
93. Nang Balai
94. Stephen Ang Teck Chai
95. Theresa Gelang Dinggin
96. Lee Siang Hua
97. Loh Ling Tai
98. Wong Tiong Kee
99. Alexander Donald
100. Augustine Anjat Beti
101. Mckevin AK Toni

=== Member (A.B.K.) ===
1. Dr. Julian Jolly

== Notable recipients ==
- The late PW (1) Temenggong Kanang Anak Langkau, SP, PGB, then awarded with the "Commander" which carries the title "Datuk" in 2011.
- Pandelela Rinong became the youngest Sarawakian to receive the order when she was awarded the "Companion" order in a special investiture ceremony to commemorate her achievement in the 2012 London Olympics.
- Izyan Alirahman, also known by her stage name Zee Avi, was conferred the "Officer" order in an investiture ceremony on 12 December 2012 alongside Mohd Hafiz Mohd Suip, also a singer-songwriter, and renowned sape player Jerry Kamit.
