= Bornean Sun Bear Conservation Centre =

Wildlife conservation and research centre

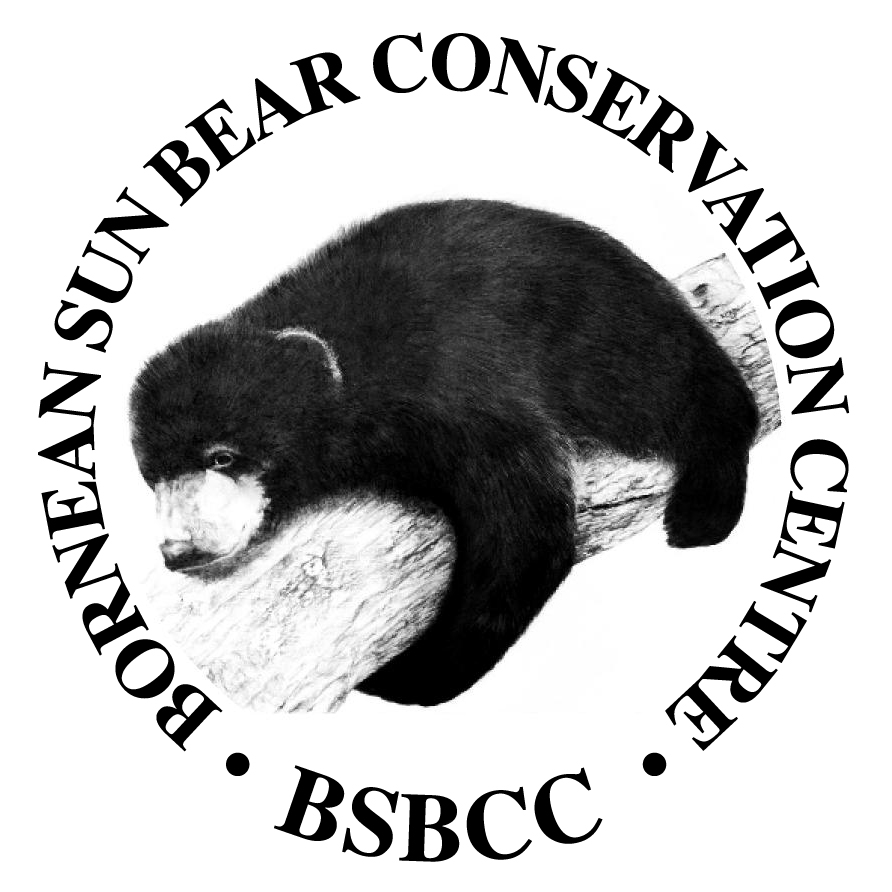
- Logo of BSBCC

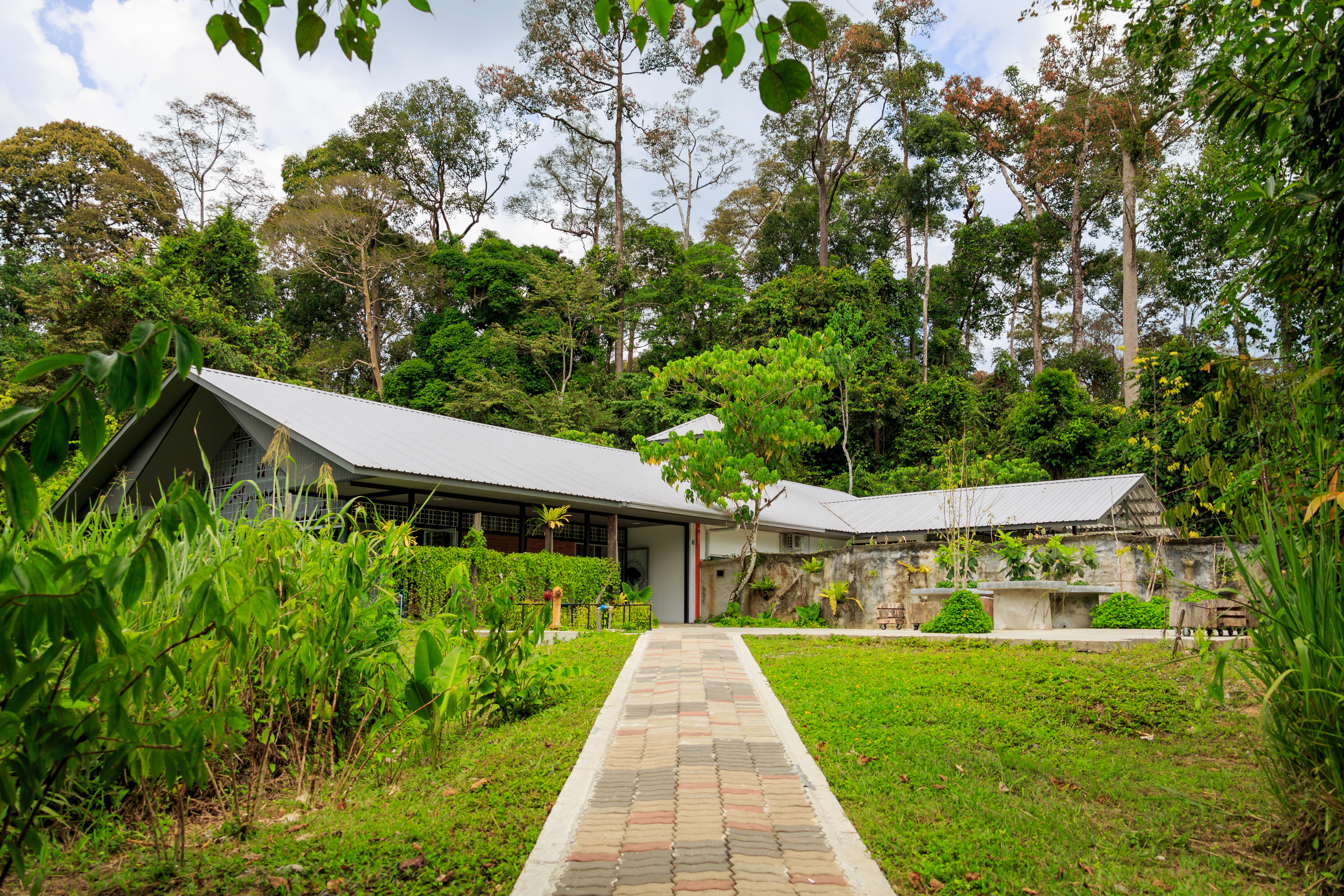
- The visitor centre in 2014

- Location within Borneo Location within Malaysia
- Location: Sepilok, Sabah, Malaysia
- Nearest city: Sandakan
- Coordinates: 5°51′49″N 117°57′0″E
- Area: 2.5 hectares (6.2 acres)
- Established: 2008; 18 years ago
- Visitors: 79,362 (in 2024)
- Website: www.bsbcc.org.my

The Bornean Sun Bear Conservation Centre (BSBCC; Malay: Pusat Pemuliharaan Beruang Madu Borneo) is a wildlife conservation and research facility in Sabah, Malaysia, focused on the care, rehabilitation, and release of Malayan sun bears (Helarctos malayanus). It was established in 2008 by wildlife biologist Wong Siew Te following a nationwide survey that found many sun bears were kept in poor and unsuitable conditions. Located next to the Sepilok Orangutan Rehabilitation Centre in the Sepilok–Kabili Forest Reserve, BSBCC works in partnership with government agencies, NGOs, and donors. As of 2025, the centre houses 42 rescued sun bears and is involved in broader conservation efforts, including the Tabin Sun Bear Project and Sabah's 10-year Bornean Sun Bear Action Plan.

== History ==
The Bornean Sun Bear Conservation Centre was established as a response to the poor conditions in which sun bears were being kept in Malaysia. In 2004, wildlife biologist Wong Siew Te received a grant to survey captive sun bears across the country. He found that most were kept in inadequate conditions, without proper monitoring or care. This prompted him to set up a dedicated facility to improve their welfare, similar to the role played by the Sepilok Orangutan Rehabilitation Centre.

A suitable location was identified next to the orangutan centre, within the Sepilok–Kabili Forest Reserve. The 2.5-hectare (6.2-acre) site had previously housed a Sumatran rhinoceros breeding programme, which ended in 2006. The area, consisting of natural forest, was seen as appropriate for sun bear rehabilitation. The Sabah Wildlife Department (SWD) and Sabah Forestry Department, who owned the land, supported the proposal and partnered with Wong, along with the non-profit organisation LEAP (Land Empowerment Animals People). BSBCC was founded in 2008 with eight sun bears, all of which had been confiscated from illegal or unsuitable environments, including zoos, private homes, plantations, logging camps, restaurants, and resorts. The Ministry of Tourism, Culture and Environment of Sabah (KePKAS) has supported the centre's establishment, helping to secure initial funding and resources.

In March 2010, the first phase of the centre's structural development was completed, resulting in the opening of a new 20-bear house and outdoor enclosures within the Sepilok Forest Reserve. The following month, in April 2010, the existing captive bears were moved into their new living spaces, grouped into social units, and given daytime access to the outdoor enclosures. A second phase of development began in September 2010. It focused on converting the old bear house into administrative and visitor facilities, including offices, a visitor centre, and a gift shop. This phase also added a quarantine area for up to 10 bears, a new viewing platform for visitors, and upgrades to the boardwalks and trails on the site.

Since then, more bears were brought to the centre, increasing the total number to 23 by the end of 2011. In 2011, funding was received from the Malaysian Federal Ministry of Tourism through SWD for the construction of an observation platform to view the bears in the forest enclosures, along with access trails from the old bear house to the platform. The project also included building an access boardwalk from the main car park at Sepilok and upgrading existing roads and drains. Construction for these improvements began in August 2011. In 2013, KePKAS provided a grant to support operational costs.

In August 2023, BSBCC launched the Tabin Sun Bear Project at Tabin Wildlife Reserve to support the soft release of rescued cubs, study wild sun bears, prevent poaching, and respond to emergency incidents or human-wildlife conflict. By 2025, the number of rescued sun bears at the centre had increased to 42, though funding and staffing remain key challenges, with the centre relying on public donations, ticket sales, and government assistance.

On 12 March 2025, Sabah introduced a 10-year Bornean Sun Bear Action Plan (2025–2034) to tackle threats such as habitat loss and poaching through coordinated conservation efforts led by SWD, BSBCC, and Danau Girang Field Centre. In June 2025, Wong outlined future plans for the centre, including a third observation platform, interpretation centre, office building, and captive breeding enclosure. BSBCC is also seeking RM1 million to build a field office and staff quarters for the Tabin project.

== Mission ==
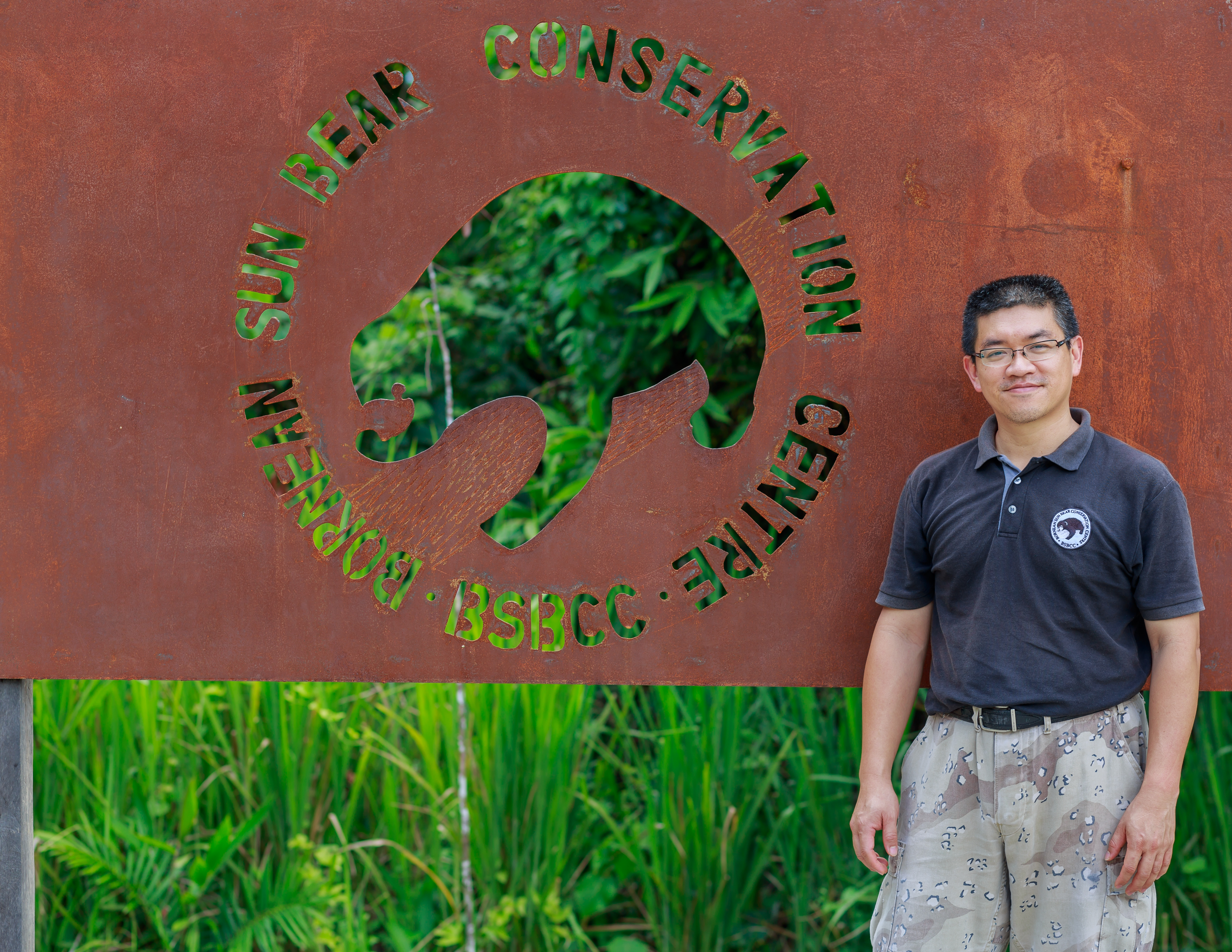
Wong Siew Te at BSBCC in 2014

BSBCC is a centre dedicated to animal welfare, education, research, and rehabilitation rather than a zoo or tourist destination. The centre works to confiscate, rehabilitate, and release orphaned and captive sun bears when possible. For bears that cannot be released, it provides improved long-term care.

The centre also aims to educate the public about the challenges sun bears face, raise awareness about their conservation, and carry out research. Through these efforts, BSBCC seeks to improve protection for sun bears and their habitats.

Sun bears face threats such as habitat loss, poaching, and illegal wildlife trade due to human activities. BSBCC addresses these by providing refuge for bears, rehabilitating and releasing them when feasible, running education programmes, and conducting research to support conservation efforts.

== Protection and rehabilitation ==
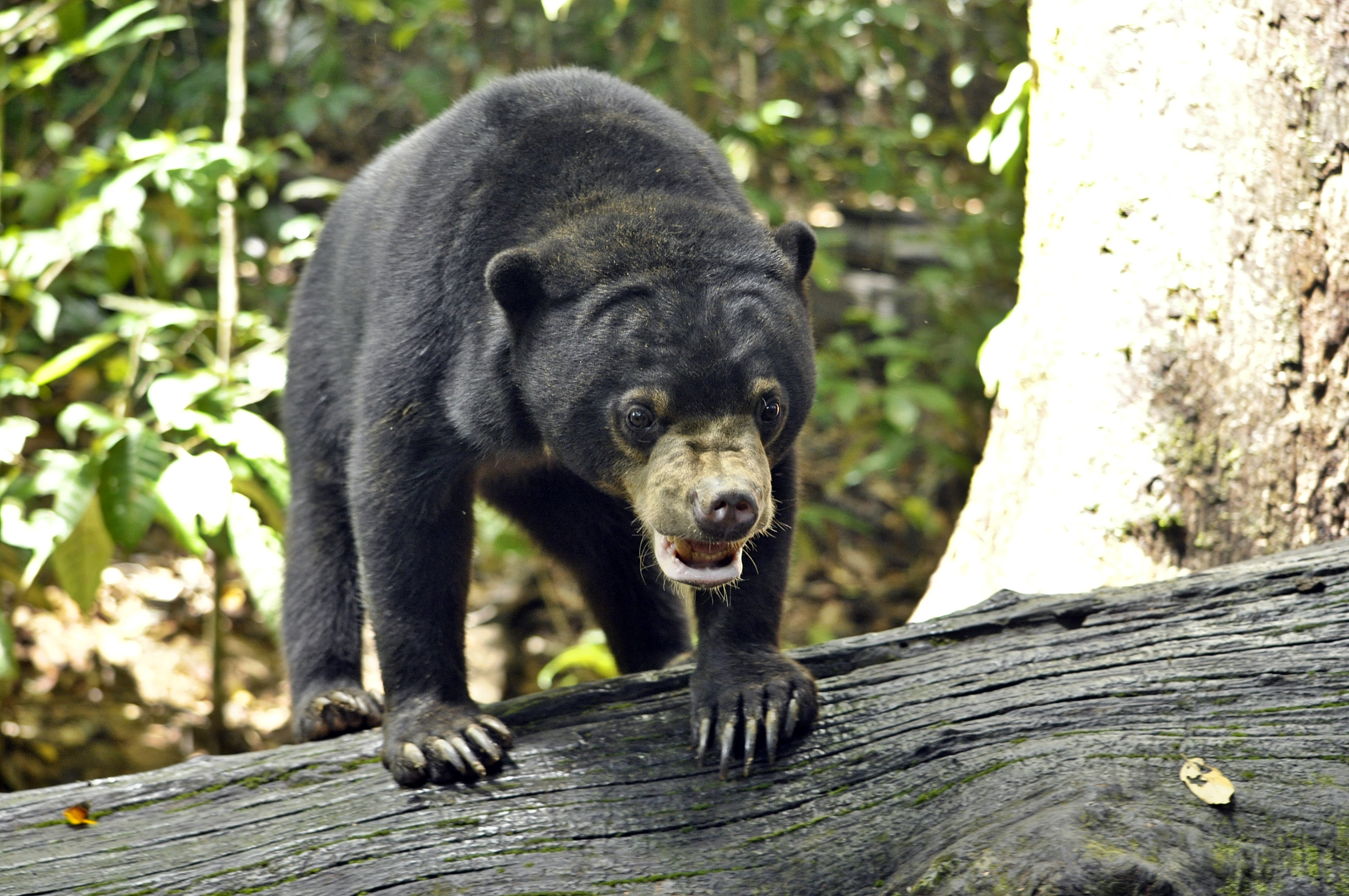
A Malayan sun bear at the Bornean Sun Bear Conservation Centre

Given their dangers including deforestation and poaching for meat and traditional medicine, sun bears are categorised as vulnerable. According to Schedule 1 of the Totally Protected wildlife species list in the Wildlife Conservation Enactment 1997, they are completely protected in Sabah; unlawful possession carries a fine of RM50,000 to RM250,000 and a maximum sentence of five years in jail.

After being unlawfully maintained as pets, the majority of the sun bears at BSBCC were either turned in or seized by SWD. After their mothers are killed, cubs are frequently removed from the wild. Although they may be valued as pets when they are small, as they get older, they become hostile. They are frequently turned over to the Royal Malaysia Police at such time. Because they are raised apart from their mothers, these bears usually lose the survival abilities necessary to survive in the wild. Such bears are received and rehabilitated by the BSBCC.
