= Wong Siew Te =

Malaysian wildlife biologist (born 1969)

Wong Siew Te DJN
- 黄修德
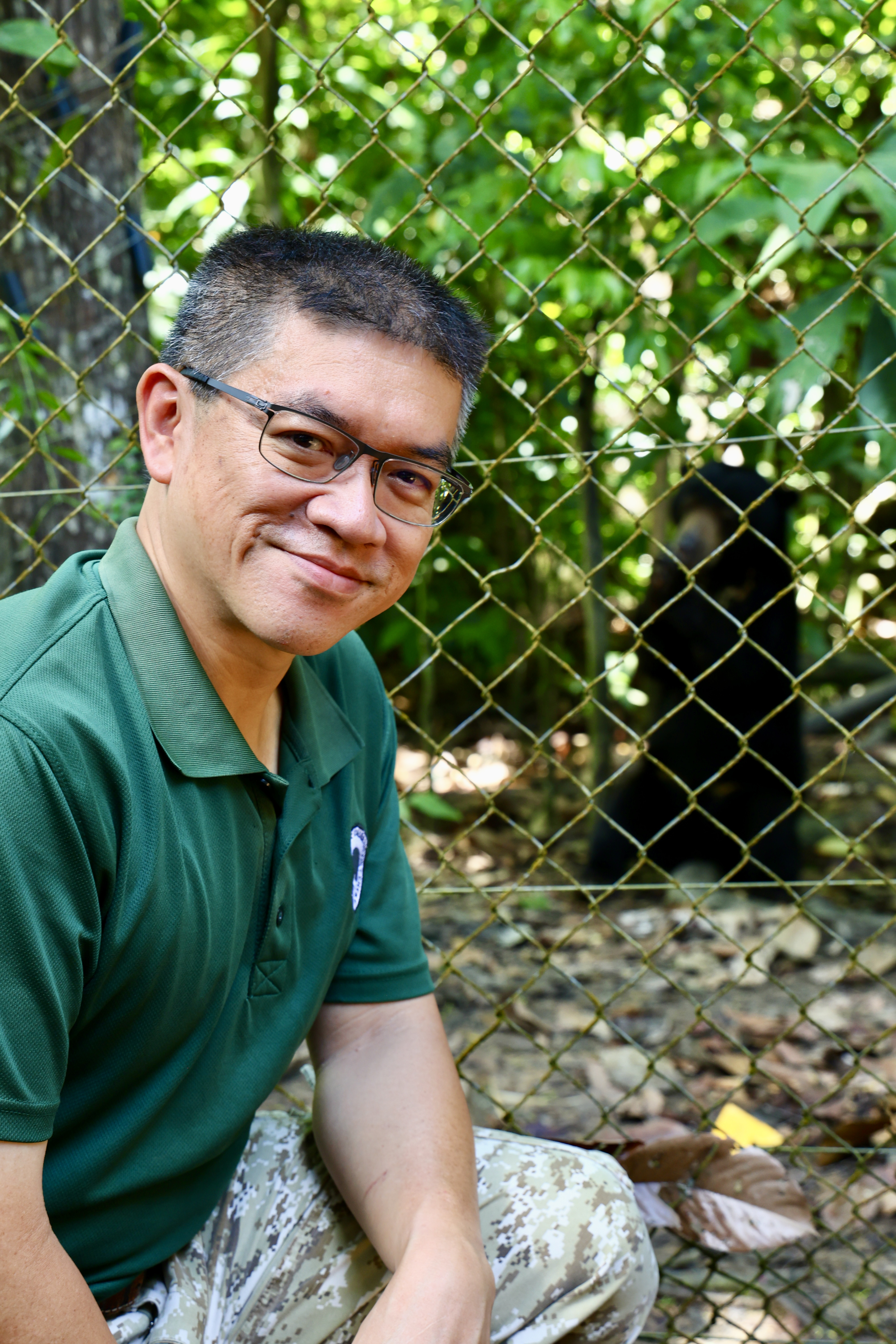
- Wong in 2025
- Born: 16 May 1969 (age 57); Bukit Mertajam, Penang, Malaysia
- Education: National Pingtung University of Science and Technology; University of Montana
- Occupation: Wildlife biologist
- Organization: Bornean Sun Bear Conservation Centre
- Known for: Research and conservation of Malayan sun bears
- Scientific career
- Fields: Wildlife biology
- Workplaces: University of Montana
- Thesis: The ecology of Malayan sun bears (Helarctos malayanus ) in the lowland tropical rainforest of Sabah Malaysian Borneo (2002)

Wong Siew Te (Note: Chinese: 黄修德; pinyin: Huáng Xiūdé) (born 16 May 1969) is a Malaysian wildlife biologist and conservationist best known for his research on the Malayan sun bear.

Wong was born in 1969 in Bukit Mertajam, Penang, developed an early interest in animals while helping on his family's fruit orchard. He studied veterinary science in Taiwan and later wildlife biology at the University of Montana, where he began focusing on sun bears. Earning a Bachelor of Science in 1997, a Master of Science in 2002, and completing doctoral research by 2011, Wong's work is driven by his goal to protect endangered sun bears and conserve Borneo's rainforest ecosystem.

From 2002 to 2005, Wong co-chaired the IUCN Sun Bear Expert Team. In 2004, after seeing captive sun bears in poor conditions, he conceived a rescue centre, inspired by the Sepilok Orangutan Rehabilitation Centre. He founded the Bornean Sun Bear Conservation Centre (BSBCC) in 2008, completing phase one in 2010 with 12 confiscated bears. By 2013, he continued rehabilitation efforts while collaborating with Jocelyn Stokes to raise awareness of sun bears' ecological role. In 2020, he launched virtual tours and adoption programmes to support 44 bears during the COVID-19 pandemic.

== Early life and education ==
Wong Siew Te was born on 16 May 1969 in Bukit Mertajam, Penang, and grew up in Sungai Bakap with eight elder siblings, four brothers and four sisters. He spent much of his childhood in the vicinity of creeks, looking after animals and helping his family cultivate their fruit orchard of durians, rambutans, mangosteens, and coconuts. His interest in animals began early, influenced by his father, who looked after injured or fallen birds. In middle school, he learned how to breed birds and fish. He also played music and was a member of a school band. Wong attended Kin Sen Primary School from 1976 to 1981 and Jit Sin High School from 1982 to 1987, both in Bukit Mertajam.

Wong studied veterinary science at Taiwan's National Pingtung University of Science and Technology (NPUST) after high school in 1989, graduating in 1992. During his time there, he joined the Bird Watching Club, where his interest in wildlife and conservation deepened through bird watching. Wong spent two years as a research assistant in Taiwan, participating in fauna surveys, establishing a rescue centre for endangered species, and conducting radio-telemetry studies on barking deer.

Wong transferred to the University of Montana in 1994 to study wildlife biology, meeting Christopher Servheen who presented him with an opportunity to study sun bears. His motive is to protect the endangered sun bear and, ultimately, to conserve the rainforest ecosystem on which both wildlife and humanity depend. Wong graduated with a Bachelor of Science in 1997 and Master of Science in 2002, authoring a thesis on Malayan sun bears in Borneo. He went on to study for a doctorate in Fish and Wildlife Biology from 2002 to 2011 at the same university, researching bearded pigs in lowland rainforests of Borneo.

== Career ==
From 2002 to 2005, Wong co-chaired the Sun Bear Expert Team for the IUCN/SSC Bear Specialist Group, a network of voluntary experts within the International Union for Conservation of Nature (IUCN). In 2004, while surveying captive sun bears across Malaysia and observing their poor living conditions, he developed the idea of creating a centre to rescue and care for these neglected and little-known bears. Inspired by a visit to the Sepilok Orangutan Rehabilitation Centre, he then planned a similar facility specifically for sun bears.

In 2007, Wong participated in filming BEARTREK, a documentary set in the Danum rainforest. In 2008, he founded and became CEO of the Bornean Sun Bear Conservation Centre (BSBCC). The centre, located in the Sepilok–Kabili Forest Reserve, operates in partnership with the Sabah Wildlife Department, the Sabah Forestry Department, and the NGO Land Empowerment Animals People to rehabilitate sun bears in a forest enclosure designed to resemble their natural habitat. Wong and his team worked with the Sabah government and private funders to establish the centre in phases, beginning fundraising in November 2008. Phase one included a bear house for 20 bears and a one-hectare forest enclosure. Malaysian actress Joanna Bessey interviewed Wong about the plight of sun bears at the BSBCC, and the program aired globally on BBC World News on 4 April 2009.

Phase one of the BSBCC was completed in March 2010. By May 2010, the centre housed twelve bears, all confiscated by the Sabah Wildlife Department. By 2013, Wong continued to lead rehabilitation efforts at the BSBCC, while Jocelyn Stokes collaborated on the Survival of the Sun Bears project, filming the bears and raising awareness of their ecological role and the threats they face from deforestation and poaching. In May 2020, Wong launched paid virtual tours, online merchandise sales, and an adoption programme to raise awareness and funds, while continuing essential rescue operations and caring for 44 sun bears, including new cubs, despite the loss of physical visitors during the COVID-19 pandemic.

== Honour and recognitions ==
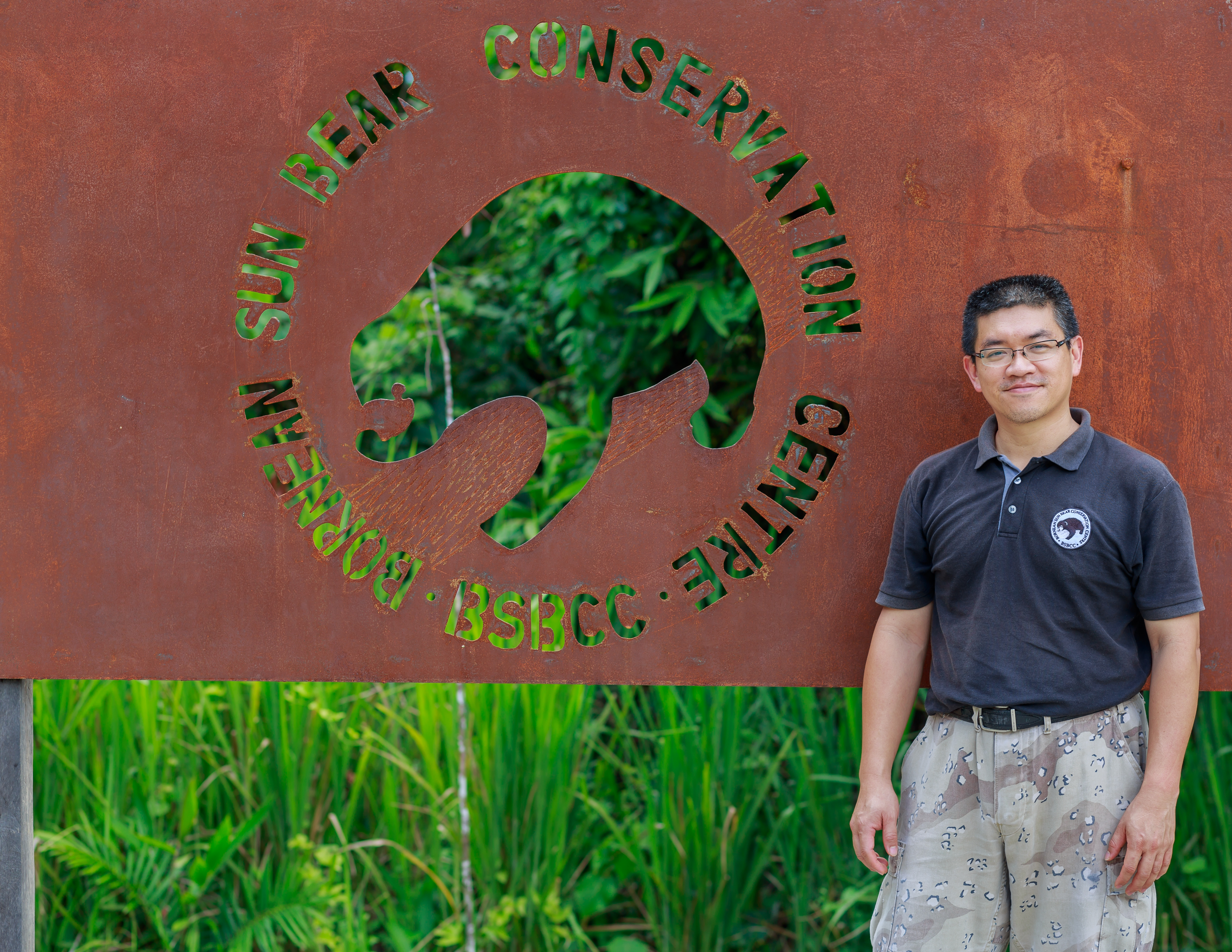
Wong in 2014

Wong has received numerous awards for his dedication to wildlife conservation, in particular his work with sun bears. Among the numerous tributes is Villa Number 2 at the Sukau Rainforest Lodge, which bears his name in recognition. He was featured as one of the wildlife heroes in the book Wildlife Heroes: 40 Leading Conservationists and the Animals They Are Committed to Saving. Wong received the Outstanding Alumni Award from the NPUST in 2014 for his exemplary work in wildlife conservation.

In 2016, Wong received an Honorary Doctorate from the University of the Sunshine Coast (UniSC) in Australia for his life's work in sun bear conservation in Southeast Asia. In 2017, he was named a Wira Negaraku (lit. transl. My Country Hero) by the Malaysian Prime Minister's Department, and later a CNN Hero by global news network CNN. In 2018, a genus of Asian stick insect, Planososibia siewtei, was named in his honour. In 2020, author Sarah Pye published Saving Sun Bears: One Man's Quest to Save a Species, a biography of his conservation efforts, written as part of her creative arts doctorate at UniSC. Wong received the President's Award from the International Association for Bear Research and Management in recognition of his 27 years of work with sun bears and 56 years in wildlife conservation.

- Member of the Order of the Defender of State (DJN; 2014)

== Selected works ==
Wong has authored multiple publications, with a selection of his work listed below.

- Chen, C.C; Pei, K.J.C.; Yang, C.M.; Kuo, M.D.; Wong, S.T.; Kuo, S.C.; Lin, F.G. (2011). "A possible case of hantavirus infection in Borneo orangutan (Pongo pygmaeus pygmaeus) and its conservation implication". Journal of Medical Primatology. 40 (1). Wiley: 2–5. doi:10.1111/j.1600-0684.2010.00442.x. PMID 20722771.
- Wong, Siew Te; Servheen, Christopher; Ambu, Laurentius; Ahmad Norhayati (2005). "Impacts of fruit production cycles on Malayan sun bears and bearded pigs in lowland tropical forest of Sabah, Malaysian Borneo". Journal of Tropical Ecology. 21 (6). Cambridge University Press: 627–639. doi:10.1017/S0266467405002622. JSTOR 4091915.
- Wong, Siew Te; Servheen, Chris; Ambu, Laurentius (2004). "Home range, movement and activity patterns, and bedding sites of Malayan sun bears Helarctos malayanus in the Rainforest of Borneo". Biological Conservation. 119 (2). Elsevier: 169–181. Bibcode:2004BCons.119..169T. doi:10.1016/J.BIOCON.2003.10.029.
- Wong, Siew Te; Servheen, Chris; Ambu, Laurentius (2002). "Food Habits of Malayan Sun Bears in Lowland Tropical Forests of Borneo". Ursus. 13. International Association for Bear Research and Management: 127–136.

== Personal life ==
Wong is married, and the couple has two daughters.
