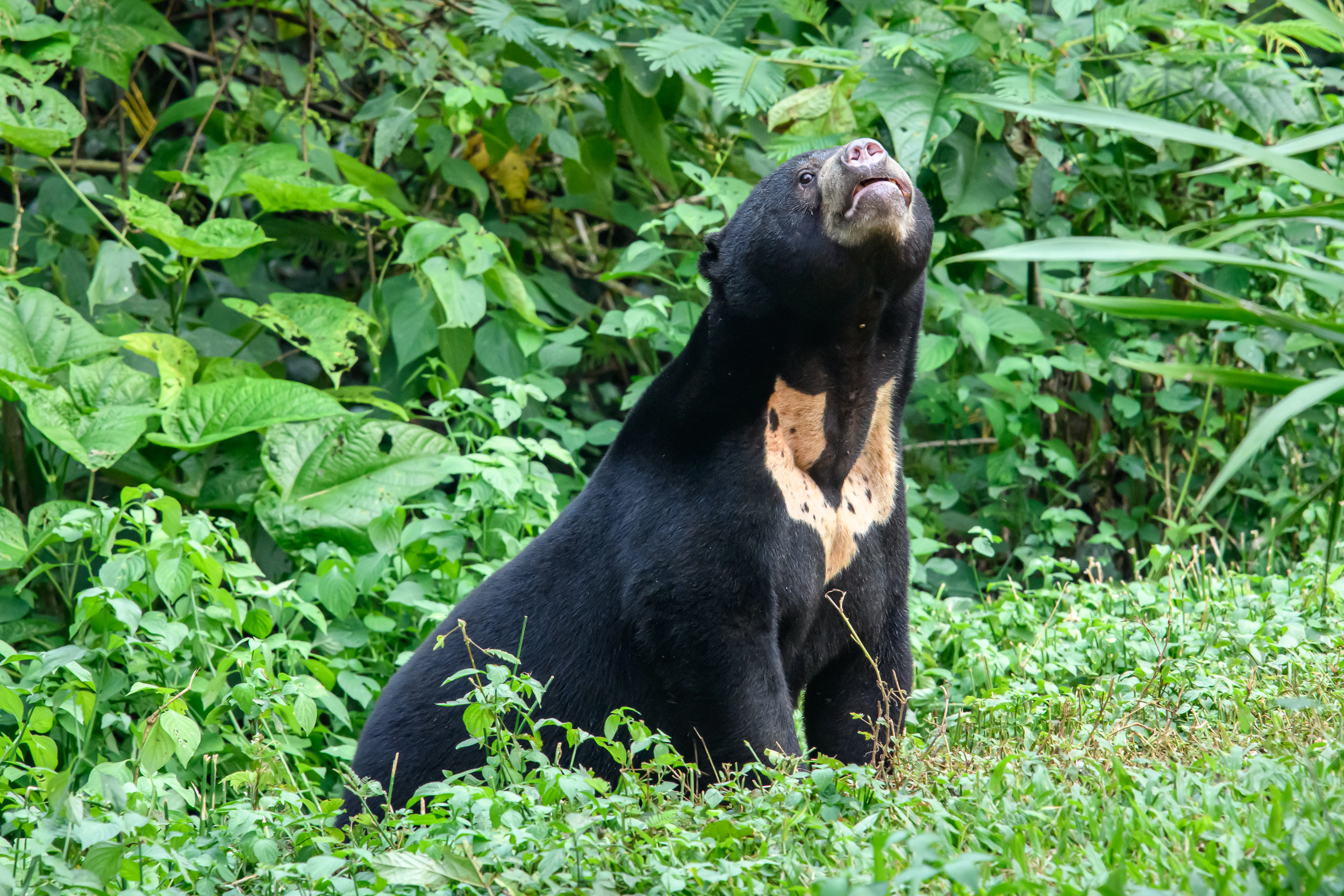
- Sun bear in Kaeng Krachan National Park

Conservation status
- Vulnerable (IUCN 3.1)
- CITES Appendix I

Scientific classification
- Kingdom: Animalia
- Phylum: Chordata
- Class: Mammalia
- Order: Carnivora
- Family: Ursidae
- Subfamily: Ursinae
- Genus: Helarctos; Horsfield, 1825
- Species: H. malayanus

Binomial name
- Helarctos malayanus (Raffles, 1821)

Subspecies
- H. m. malayanus Raffles, 1821 (Malayan sun bear); H. m. euryspilus Horsfield, 1825 (Bornean sun bear)
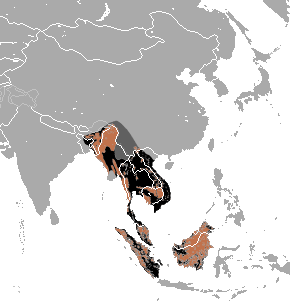
- Distribution of the sun bear (2010) (brown – extant, black – former, dark grey – presence uncertain)

Synonyms
- List: Helarctos anmamiticus Heude, 1901; H. euryspilus Horsfield, 1825; Ursus malayanus Raffles, 1821

= Sun bear =

Sun bear Temporal range: Middle Pleistocene–recent, 0.8–0 Ma

Tropical species of bear

The sun bear (Helarctos malayanus) is a bear species in the family Ursidae found in the tropical forests of Southeast Asia. It is the only species in the genus Helarctos and the smallest bear species, standing nearly 70 cm (28 in) at the shoulder and weighing 25–65 kg (55–143 lb). It is stockily built, with large paws, strongly curved claws, small, rounded ears and a short snout. The fur is generally short and jet black, but can vary from grey to red. The sun bear gets its name from its characteristic orange to cream-coloured chest patch.

The sun bear's unique morphology with inward-turned front feet, flattened chest, powerful forelimbs with large claws suggests adaptations for climbing, and it is an excellent climber and the most arboreal of all bears. It sunbathes or sleeps in trees 2 to 7 m (6 ft 7 in to 23 ft 0 in) above the ground. It is mainly active during the day, though nocturnality might be more common in areas frequented by humans. It tends to remain solitary, but sometimes occur in pairs such as a mother and her cub. It does not hibernate, possibly because food resources are available the whole year throughout its range. It is an omnivore, and its diet includes ants, bees, beetles, honey, termites, and plant material such as seeds and several kinds of fruits; vertebrates such as birds and deer are also eaten occasionally. It breeds throughout the year; individuals become sexually mature at two to four years of age. Litters comprise one or two cubs that remain with their mother for around three years.

The range of the sun bear is bounded by Northeast India to the north then south to southeast through Bangladesh, mainland Southeast Asia, Brunei and Indonesia. These bears are threatened by heavy deforestation and poaching for food and the wildlife trade. They are also harmed in conflicts with humans when they enter farmlands, plantations, and orchards. The global population is estimated to have declined by 35% since the 1990s. It is listed as vulnerable on the IUCN Red List.

== Etymology ==
The generic name Helarctos comes from two Greek words: ήλιος (hēlios, related to the sun) and αρκτος (arctos, bear). Another name is "honey bear", beruang madu in Malay and Indonesian, in reference to its habit of feeding on honey from honeycombs.

== Taxonomy and phylogeny ==
The scientific name Ursus malayanus was proposed by Stamford Raffles in 1821 when he first described a sun bear from Sumatra. In 1825, Thomas Horsfield placed the species in a genus of its own, Helarctos, when describing a sun bear from Borneo.

=== Subspecies and distribution ===
Image	Name	Distribution	Description/Comments
	Malayan sun bear (H. m. malayanus)	The Malayan sun bear occurs in mainland Southeast Asia, Bangladesh and Sumatra.	Smallest member of the bear family.
	Bornean sun bear (H. m. euryspilus)	The Bornean sun bear occurs only in Borneo.	Its skull is smaller than that of the Malayan sun bear.

H. annamiticus, described by Pierre Marie Heude in 1901 from Annam, is not considered a distinct species, but is subordinated as a junior synonym to H. m. malayanus. In 1906, Richard Lydekker proposed another subspecies by the name H. m. wardii for a sun bear skull, noting its similarities to a skull from Tibet with a thicker coat, but the Tibetan specimen was later found to be an Asian black bear (Ursus thibetanus). Genetic differences between the two subspecies are obscure and some consider the species monotypic.

=== Phylogeny ===
The phylogenetic relationships among ursid species have remained ambiguous over the years. Noting the production of fertile hybrids between sun bears and sloth bears (Melursus ursinus), it was proposed that Helarctos be treated as a synonym of Melursus. However, studies differed on whether the two species were closely related. The brown bear/polar bear genetic lineage was estimated to have genetically diverged from the two black bears/sun bear lineage around 6.72 to 5.54 million years ago (mya); the sun bear appears to have diverged from the two black bears between 6.26 and 5.09 mya. and 5.89–3.51 mya. Nuclear gene sequencing of bear species revealed that the sloth bear and the sun bear were the first Ursinae bears that radiated and are not included in the monophyletic Ursus group; moreover, all relationships between the bears were well resolved.

One possible phylogeny is based on complete mitochondrial DNA sequences from Yu et al. (2007). The polar bear and the brown bear form a close grouping, while the relationships of the other species are not very well resolved.

- Ursidae
  - Giant panda (Ailuropoda melanoleuca)
  - - Spectacled bear (Tremarctos ornatus)
    - - Ursinae
        - Sloth bear (Melursus ursinus)
        - - - Sun bear (Helarctos malayanus)
            - - Asian black bear (Ursus thibetanus)
              - American black bear (Ursus americanus)
          - - Polar bear (Ursus maritimus)
            - Brown bear (Ursus arctos)

A more recent phylogeny is based on the genetic study of Kumar et al. (2017). It concludes that Ursine bears originated around five million years ago, with extensive hybridization among the different species.

- Ursidae
  - Giant panda (Ailuropoda melanoleuca)
  - - Spectacled bear (Tremarctos ornatus)
    - Ursinae
      - - - Sloth bear (Melursus ursinus)
          - Sun bear (Helarctos malayanus)
        - Asian black bear (Ursus thibetanus)
      - - American black bear (Ursus americanus)
        - - Polar bear (Ursus maritimus)
          - Brown bear (Ursus arctos)

== Characteristics ==
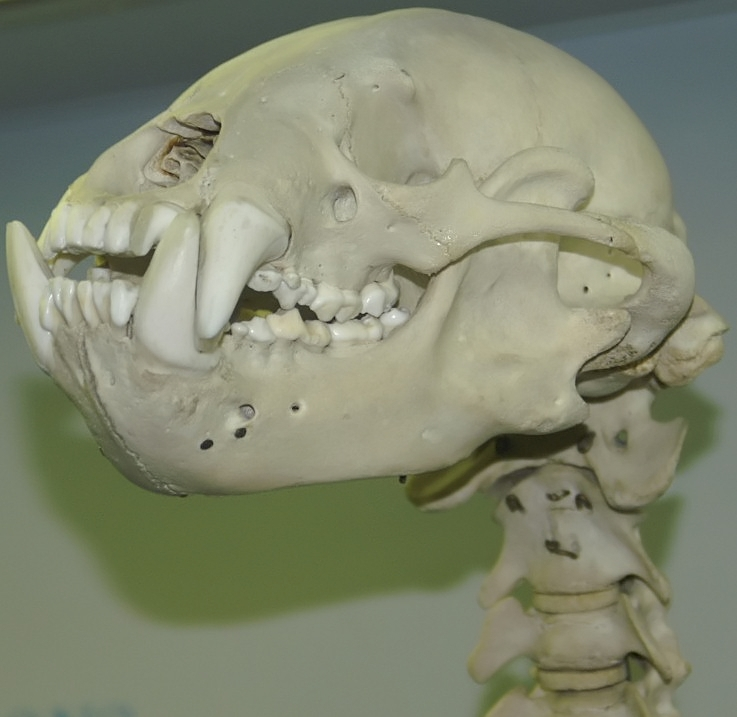
Skull, showing short snout

The sun bear is named so for its characteristic orange- to cream-coloured, crescent-like chest patch. It is the smallest of all bear species. It is stockily built, with large paws, strongly curved claws, small rounded ears and a short snout. The head-and-body length is between 100 and 140 cm (39 and 55 in), and the shoulder height is nearly 70 cm (28 in). Males tend to be larger than females by roughly 10-20%. Adults weigh 25–65 kg (55–143 lb). The snout is grey, silver, or orange. The fur is generally jet black, but can vary from grey to red. The hair is silky and fine, and is the shortest of all bear species, suiting its hot tropical habitat. The characteristic chest patch, typically U-shaped, but sometimes circular or spotlike, varies from orange or ochre-yellow to buff or cream, or even white. Some individuals lack this patch. Sun bears can expose the patch while standing on their hind feet as a threat display against enemies. Infants are greyish black with a pale brown or white snout and the chest patch is dirty white; the coat of older juveniles may be dark brown. The underfur is particularly thick and black in adults, while the guard hairs are lighter. Two whorls occur on the shoulders, from whence the hair radiates in all directions. It has a crest on the sides of the neck and a whorl in the centre of the breast patch. The edges of the paws are tan or brown, and the soles are fur-less, which possibly is an adaptation for climbing trees. The claws are sickle-shaped; the front claws are long and heavy. The tail is 3–7 cm (1.2–2.8 in) long. The sympatric Asian black bear has cream-coloured chest markings of a similar shape as those of sun bears and different claw markings.

During feeding, the sun bear can extend its exceptionally long tongue to extract insects and honey. The teeth are very large, especially the canines, and the bite force quotient is high relative to its body size for reasons not well understood; a possible explanation could be its frequent opening of tropical hardwood trees with its powerful jaws and claws in pursuit of insects, larvae, or honey. The bite force is high for its size: a sun bear weighing 50 kg (110 lb) bites with a maximum force of 1907.3–2020.6 Newtons on the rear molar. The head is large, broad and heavy in proportion to the body, but the ears are proportionately smaller; the palate is wide in proportion to the skull. The overall unique morphology of this bear, such as its inward-turned front feet, flattened chest, and powerful fore limbs with large claws, indicates adaptations for extensive climbing.

== Distribution and habitat ==
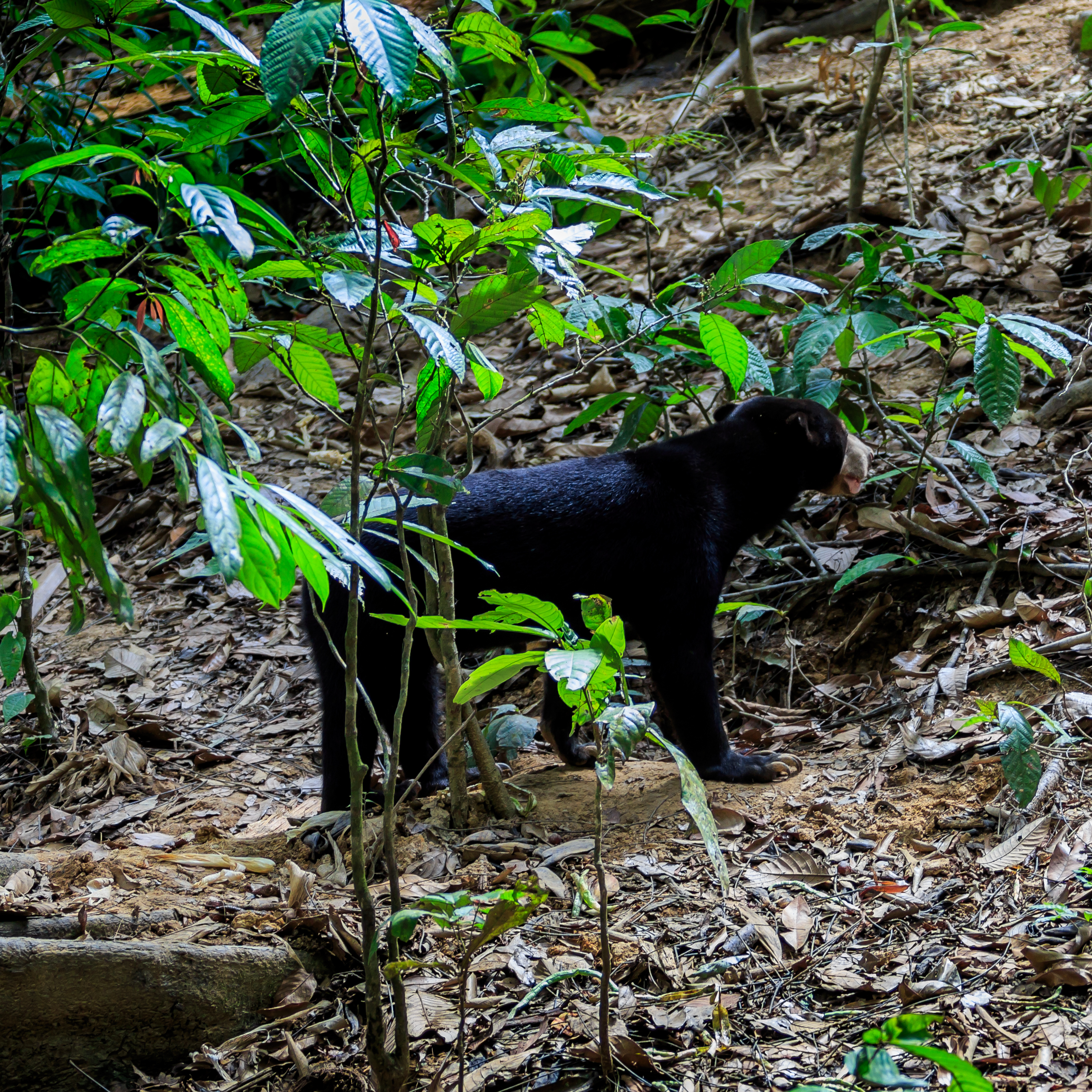
Sun bear in the Bornean Sun Bear Conservation Centre (Malaysia)

The sun bear is native to the tropical forests of Southeast Asia; its range is bound by northeastern India to the north and extends south to Bangladesh, Myanmar, Thailand, Cambodia, Laos, and Vietnam to Brunei, Indonesia, and Malaysia to the south. Its presence in China was confirmed in 2017 when it was sighted in Yingjiang County of Yunnan Province. It is extinct in Singapore.

These bears dwell primarily in two main types of forests throughout their range - deciduous and seasonally evergreen forests to the north of the Isthmus of Kra, and non-seasonal evergreen forests in Indonesia and Malaysia. They are typically found at low altitudes, such as below 1,200 m (3,900 ft) in western Thailand and peninsular Malaysia, but this varies widely throughout the range; in India, larger numbers have been recorded at elevations up to 3,000 m (9,800 ft) than in low-lying areas, probably due to habitat loss at ground level. They occur in montane areas in northeast India, but may not extend farther north into the unfavourable and colder Himalayan region; their distribution might be restricted to the northwest due to competition with sloth bears. The sun bear is sympatric with the Asian black bear throughout the remaining areas in the mainland range featuring a mix of seasonal forest types, with monthly rainfall below 100 mm (3.9 in) for a long spell of 3–7 months. In mountainous areas, Asian black bears are more common than sun bears, probably due to scarcity of invertebrates on which to feed. The major habitats in southern Thailand and peninsular Malaysia are moist evergreen forests, with more or less unvarying climate and heavy rainfall throughout the year, and low-lying or montane dipterocarp forests. Mangroves may be inhabited, but usually only when they are close to preferred habitat types.

The sun bear tends to avoid heavily logged forests and areas close to human settlement. However, sun bears have been seen in farmlands, plantations and orchards, where they may be considered vermin. A survey in Lower Kinabatangan Segama Wetlands showed that sun bears were feared but were not common in oil palm plantations; Bornean bearded pigs, elephants and macaques were far more damaging to crops. Sun bears have been reported preying on poultry and livestock.

Fossil remains suggest its occurrence farther north during the Pleistocene; it may have occurred as far south as Java in the middle to Late Pleistocene. Fossils also known from the Middle Pleistocene of Thailand along with Stegodon, gaur, wild water buffalo, and other living and extinct mammals. Today, it is locally extinct in the majority of its erstwhile range, especially in Thailand; populations are declining in most of the range countries. It disappeared from Singapore during the 1800s and 1900s, possibly due to extensive deforestation. Sun bear populations appear to decrease in size northward from Sundaland, and numbers are especially low in the northern and western extremes of the range. This has possibly been the case since prehistoric times, and is not a result of human interference. The population density varies from 4.3 and 5.9 individuals/km^{2} (11 and 15 individuals/sq mi) in Khao Yai National Park to 26 individuals/km^{2} (67 individuals/sq mi) in the Harapan Rainforest in southern Sumatra.

== Ecology and behaviour ==
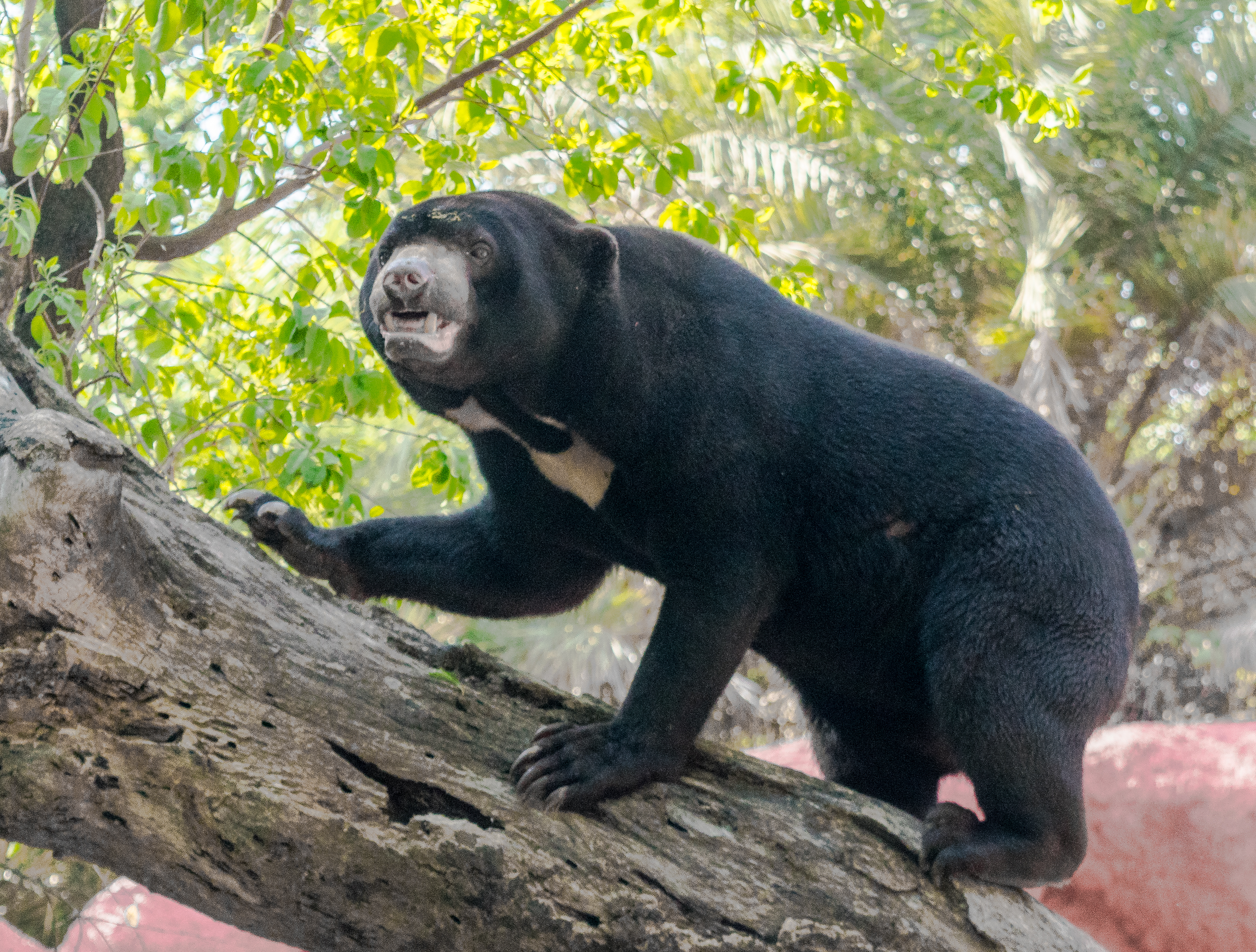
Sun bears are among the most arboreal of bears.

The sun bear leads a particularly arboreal lifestyle among bears. It is a capable climber; it sunbathes or sleeps in trees 2 to 7 m (6 ft 7 in to 23 ft 0 in) above the ground. Bedding sites consist mainly of fallen hollow logs, but they also rest in standing trees with cavities, underneath fallen logs or tree roots, and in tree branches high above the ground. It is also an efficient swimmer.

The sun bear is solitary but is sometimes seen in pairs such as mothers and cubs. For a broad view of its surroundings or smell far-off objects, it stands on its hind feet; it tries to intimidate its enemies by displaying its chest patch if threatened. Its vocalisations includes grunts and snuffles while foraging for insects, and roars similar to those of a male orangutan during the breeding season; less commonly, it gives out short barks when surprised. It does not hibernate, possibly because food resources are available the whole year throughout the range.

The sun bear is mainly active during the day, although nocturnality might be more common in areas frequented by humans. It is noted for its intelligence; a captive bear observed sugar being stored in a cupboard locked by a key, and later used its claw to open the lock. A study published in 2019 described skillful mimicry of facial expressions by sun bears, with precision comparable to that seen in gorillas and humans.

The sun bear has home ranges of varying sizes in different areas, ranging from 7 to 27 km^{2} (2.7 to 10.4 sq mi) in Borneo and Peninsular Malaysia; and 8.7 to 20.9 km^{2} (3.4 to 8.1 sq mi) in Ulu Segama Forest Reserve in Sabah.

The tiger is its major predator; dholes and leopards have also been recorded preying on sun bears, but cases are relatively few. In one incident, a tiger-sun bear interaction resulted in a prolonged altercation and in the death of both animals. In another incident, a wild female sun bear was swallowed by a large reticulated python in East Kalimantan.

Sun bears usually do not attack humans unless provoked to do so, or if they are injured or with their cubs; their timid nature led these bears to be often tamed and kept as pets in the past. Sun bears are fierce when surprised in the forest.

=== Diet ===
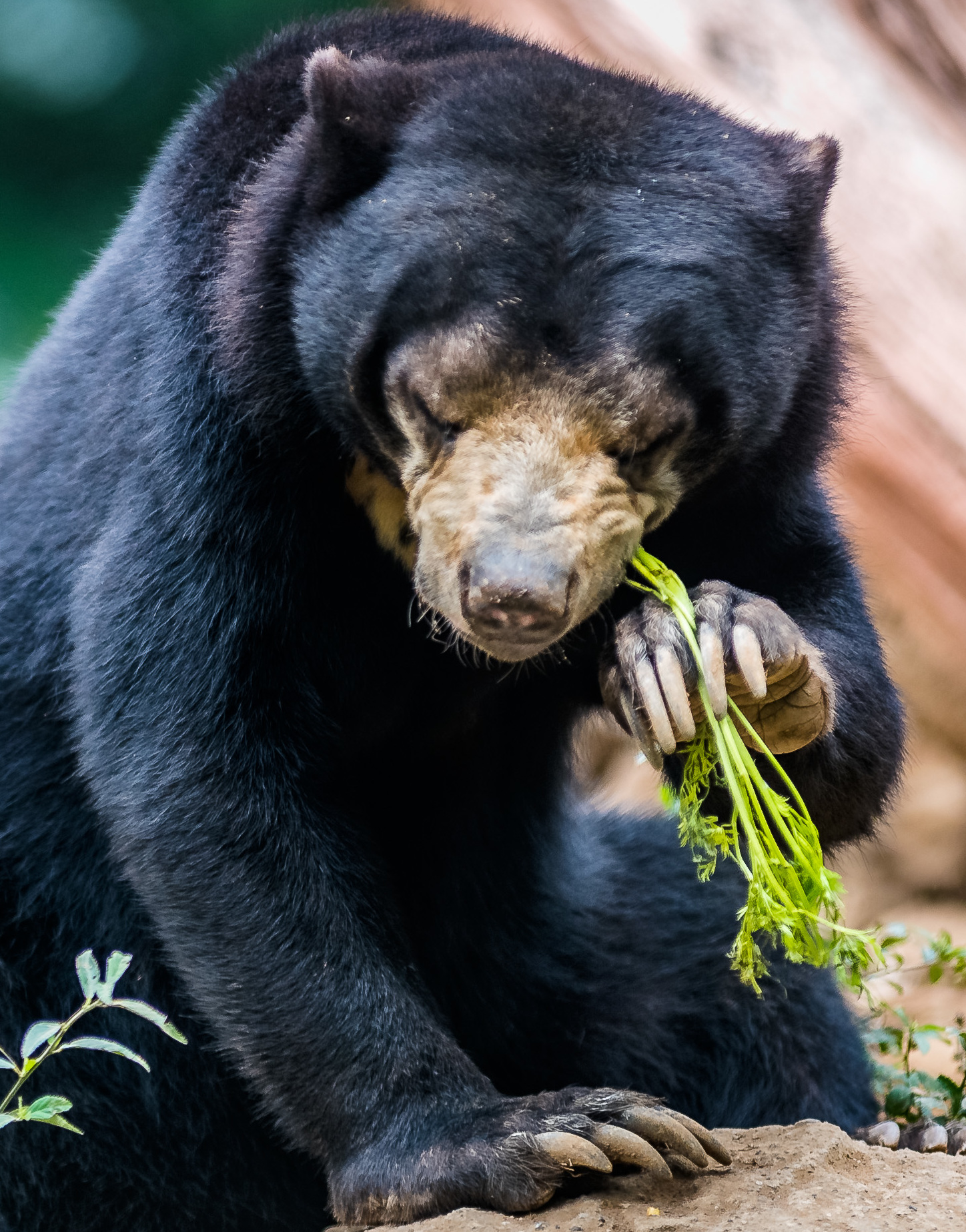
Sun bear in Taman Safari

The sun bear is an omnivore with a broad diet, such as ants, bees, beetles, honey, termites, and plant material such as seeds and several kinds of fruits. Sun bear scat collected in Ulu Segama Forest Reserve in Sabah also contained remains of the Asian forest tortoise, other reptiles, and of figs and other fruits. In the forests of Kalimantan, the fruits of Moraceae, Burseraceae, and Myrtaceae species made up more than 50% of the fruit diet; in times of fruit scarcity, sun bears switched to a more insectivorous diet. Royal palms are nutritious but not enough for subsistence. It forages mostly at night. It tears open hollow trees with its long, sharp claws and teeth in search of wild bees and honey. It breaks termite mounds and quickly licks and sucks the contents, holding pieces of the broken mound with its front paws.

A study in Central Borneo revealed that sun bears play an important role in the seed dispersal of Canarium pilosum. Sun bears eat the centre of coconut palms, and crush oil-rich seeds such as acorns.

=== Reproduction ===
The sun bear is polyoestrous; births occur throughout the year. Oestrus lasts five to seven days. Sun bears become sexually mature at two to four years of age. Reported lengths for Gestation varies from 95 to 240 days; pregnancy tends to be longer in zoos in temperate climate possibly due to delay in implantation or fertilisation. Births occur inside hollow tree cavities. A litter typically comprises one or two cubs weighing around 325 g (11.5 oz) each. Cubs are born deaf with eyes closed. The eyes open at nearly 25 days, but they remain blind till 50 days after birth; the sense of hearing improves over the first 50 days. Cubs younger than two months are dependent on external stimulation for defecation. Cubs are kept on buttress roots at the base of trees until they learn how to walk and climb properly. Mothers protect their cubs aggressively. Offspring remain with their mother for nearly the first three years of their lives. Lifespan in captivity is generally over 20 years; one individual has lived for 34 years.

== Threats ==
According to the IUCN Bear Specialist Group, sun bear populations have fallen by an estimated 35% since the 1990s. Numbers are especially low in Bangladesh and China, and populations in Vietnam are feared to decline severely by 50–80% in the next 30 years. Habitat fragmentation is on the rise, particularly in Borneo, Sumatra, and some areas of the mainland range. Heavy deforestation (due to agriculture, logging, and forest fires) and hunting for wildlife trade are severe threats throughout the range; human-bear conflicts are a relatively minor threat. Compared to other continents, Southeast Asia has undergone severe depletion in forest cover over the past few decades (by almost 12% between 1990 and 2010); this has resulted in substantial habitat loss for forest-dependent species such as sun bears. A 2007 study in East Borneo recorded severe loss of habitat and food resources due to droughts and forest fires brought about by the El Niño.

Studies have found evidence of pet trade and sale of sun bear parts such as gall bladders in traditional Chinese medicine (TCM) shops in Sabah and Sarawak. In 2018 and 2019, 128 TCM outlets in 24 locations across Sabah and Sarawak were surveyed and bear parts and derivatives were recorded for sale in 25% of the outlets surveyed, many of which would have been derived from locally sourced sun bears. Sun bears were killed by shooting or administering poison to protect coconut and snakefruit plantations in east Kalimantan. A report published by TRAFFIC in 2011 showed that sun bears, along with Asian black bears and brown bears, are specifically targeted for the bear bile trade in Southeast Asia, and are kept in bear farms in Laos, Vietnam, and Myanmar. Poaching is common in several countries in the region.

Hunting pressure is rising even in some protected areas; in the Nam Ha National Protected Area in Laos, hunter snares have been found that specifically target bears. A study in Nagaland (northeastern India) recorded a sparse distribution of sun bears in Fakim and Ntangki National Parks, and reported extensive illegal hunting for food and trade in bear parts. Protective laws have shown little success in controlling these threats, especially due to poor execution and high potential for gains by the trade.

== Conservation ==
A sun bear in Surabaya Zoo

The sun bear is listed as vulnerable on the IUCN Red List, and is included in CITES Appendix I. With the exception of Sarawak (Malaysia) and Cambodia, the sun bear is legally protected from hunting in its whole range. A 2014 report documented rampant poaching and trade in sun bear parts in Sarawak, more than anywhere else in Malaysia; the researchers recommended stricter legislations in the state to protect local sun bears.

=== In captivity ===
The Malayan sun bear is part of an international captive-breeding program and a Species Survival Plan under the Association of Zoos and Aquariums since late 1994. Since that same year, the European breed registry for the sun bear is kept in the Cologne Zoological Garden, Germany.

The Bornean Sun Bear Conservation Centre, founded in 2008, aims to work for the welfare of sun bears rescued from poor conditions in captivity and spread awareness about their conservation.

Several sanctuaries in Southeast Asia aim to reduce the illegal trade in sun bears and offer opportunities for rehabilitation, research and improved public awareness. A conservation action plan was published in 2019.
