= Ministry of Tourism, Culture and Environment of Sabah =

Ministry of Tourism, Culture and Environment
- Kementerian Pelancongan, Kebudayaan dan Alam Sekitar

Agency overview
- Type: State ministry
- Jurisdiction: Government of Sabah
- Headquarters: Tingkat 5, Blok A Wisma Tun Fuad Stephens Karamunsing, 88300 Kota Kinabalu, Sabah
- Annual budget: RM134.59 million
- Minister responsible: Datuk Christina Liew Chin Jin, Minister of Tourism, Culture and Environment
- Assistant minister responsible: Joniston Bangkuai, Assistant Minister
- Website: https://kepkas.sabah.gov.my/

The Ministry of Tourism, Culture and Environment of Sabah (KePKAS; Malay: Kementerian Pelancongan, Kebudayaan dan Alam Sekitar Sabah) is a state ministry of Sabah. It is responsible for tourism, culture, arts, heritage, environment and forest conservation.

== Ministry executives ==
The Ministry is administrated by:

- Datuk Christina Liew, the Minister
  - Datuk Joniston Bangkuai, the Assistant Minister
    - Datuk Mohd Yusrie Abdullah, Permanent Secretary
      - Mary Isidore Malangking, Deputy Permanent Secretary I (Services Sector)
      - Alesia Sion, Deputy Permanent Secretary II (Management Sector)

== Agencies under the Ministry ==
The agencies that fall under jurisdiction of this Ministry including:

- Sabah Tourism Board
- Environment Protection Department
- Sabah Cultural Board
- Sabah Wildlife Department
- Sabah Parks
- Sabah Museum
