= Among the Great Apes with Michelle Yeoh =

- Directed by: Harun Rahman; Lara Ariffin
- Written by: Kathryn Pasternak
- Produced by: Lara Ariffin; Lina Teoh; Sabrina Chen-Louie; Effa Desa
- Starring: Michelle Yeoh
- Cinematography: Brad Dillon, Harun Rahman, Wong Chin Hor
- Edited by: Daniel Sheire
- Music by: Farul Farid
- Production company: Novista
- Release date: December 9, 2009
- Running time: 50 minutes
- Countries: Malaysia; United States
- Language: English

Among the Great Apes with Michelle Yeoh is a 2009 documentary film made by National Geographic in cooperation with FINAS (National Film Development Corporation Malaysia). The film is notable for showing how the Sepilok Orangutan Rehabilitation Centre (also known as Sepilok Orang Utan Sanctuary) in Sabah is fighting for the survival and well-being of each ape. The film was broadcast internationally and presented at the Eco-Knights Film Festival 2011.

== Synopsis ==
In the documentary, Michelle Yeoh visits her adopted orangutan in her home country Malaysia and studies for three weeks what is done to sustain the long-term population of this endangered species. Guided by Dr Cecilia Boklin, Yeoh takes part in all activities; she is filmed nurturing an orphaned suckling orangutan.

== Accolades ==
- Best Natural History or Wildlife Programme or Docu-drama, Asian Television Awards 2010
- Best Environmental/Tourism Documentary, Malaysian Documentary Awards 2010
