= Gaya Street, Kota Kinabalu =

Sunday market in Malaysia

Gaya Street, Kota Kinabalu Bond Street, Jesselton
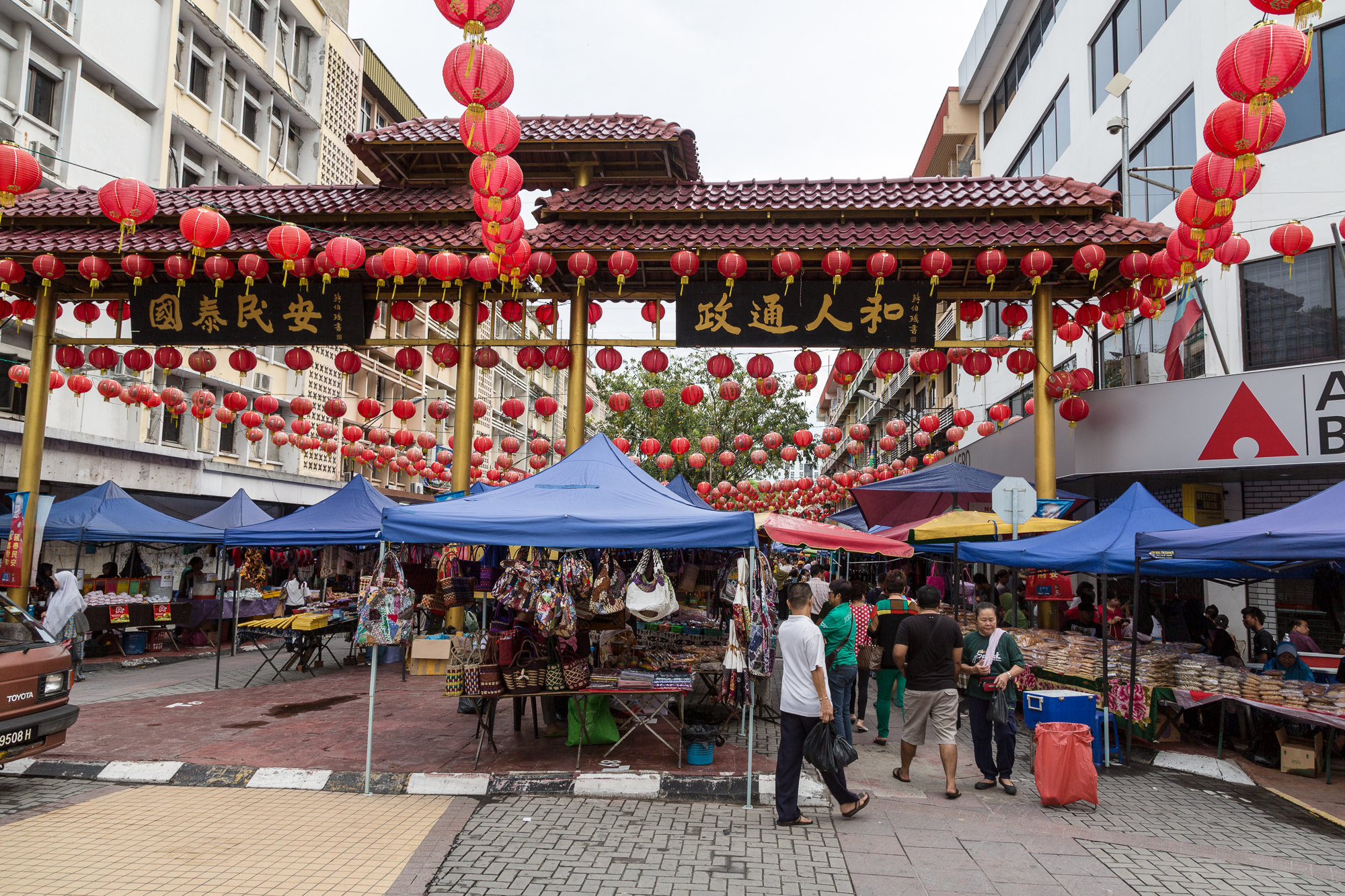
- Chinese-style welcome gate at Gaya Street, Kota Kinabalu.
- Traditional Chinese: 加雅街
- Simplified Chinese: 加雅街
Transcriptions
Standard Mandarin
- Hanyu Pinyin: Jiā Yǎ Jiē

The Gaya Street is a street Sunday market (tamu) area in Kota Kinabalu, Sabah, Malaysia. It is known as the Chinatown of Sabah due to many Chinese coffee shops and restaurants situated there. In addition with an arch gate that was erected since 2005.

== History ==
The street was known as Bond Street during the British colonial era, and was established in 1902, after the construction of shop houses there was completed. The street started as a railway track for the transportation of rubber all the way from Sapong and Melalap rubber estates in Tenom which ended at the wharf. The Jesselton Harbour was the main gateway from North Borneo during when there is still no passenger planes. The market is once considered as the "heart" of Jesselton as major business activities was done there.

Since then, farmers and ordinary folks from the interior and fishermen from the coastal areas would make their trip to sell agricultural produce and other crops in the market, this include the Chinese immigrants as well Filipino and Indonesian traders. Aside from agricultural products, local food, souvenirs, arts and craft, footwear, antiques and even pets are sold in the market.

Along the market street, it is also the place where the old Jesselton Post Office (now the main office of Sabah Tourism Board (STB)) are located together with the Jesselton Hotel.

== Gallery ==
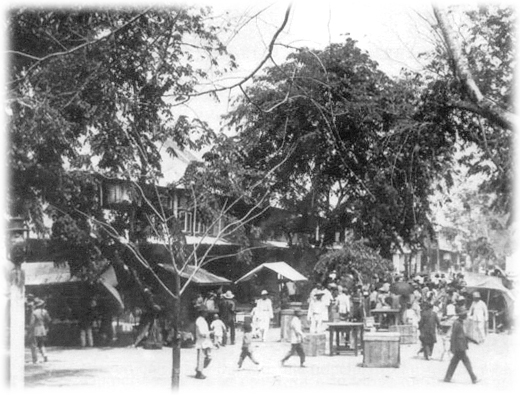
Bond Street in 1914.

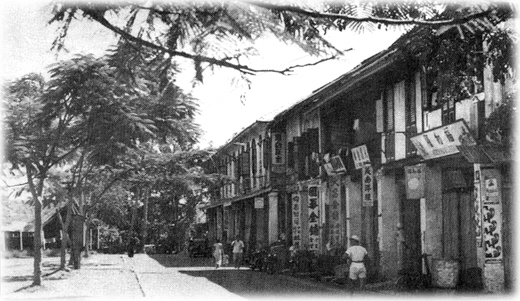
Bond Street with Chinese shops in 1930.

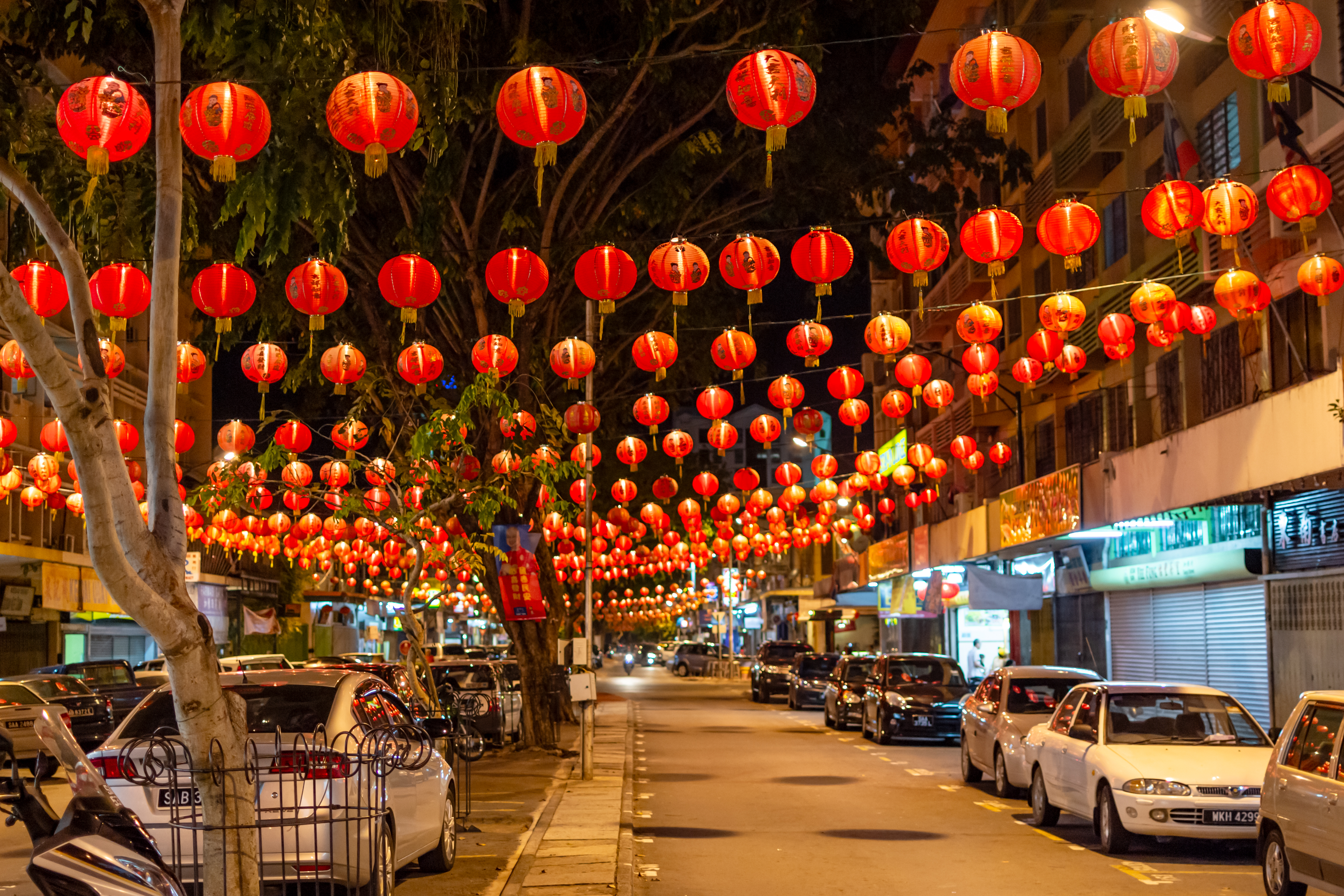
Gaya Street today filled with Chinese lanterns during Chinese New Year.

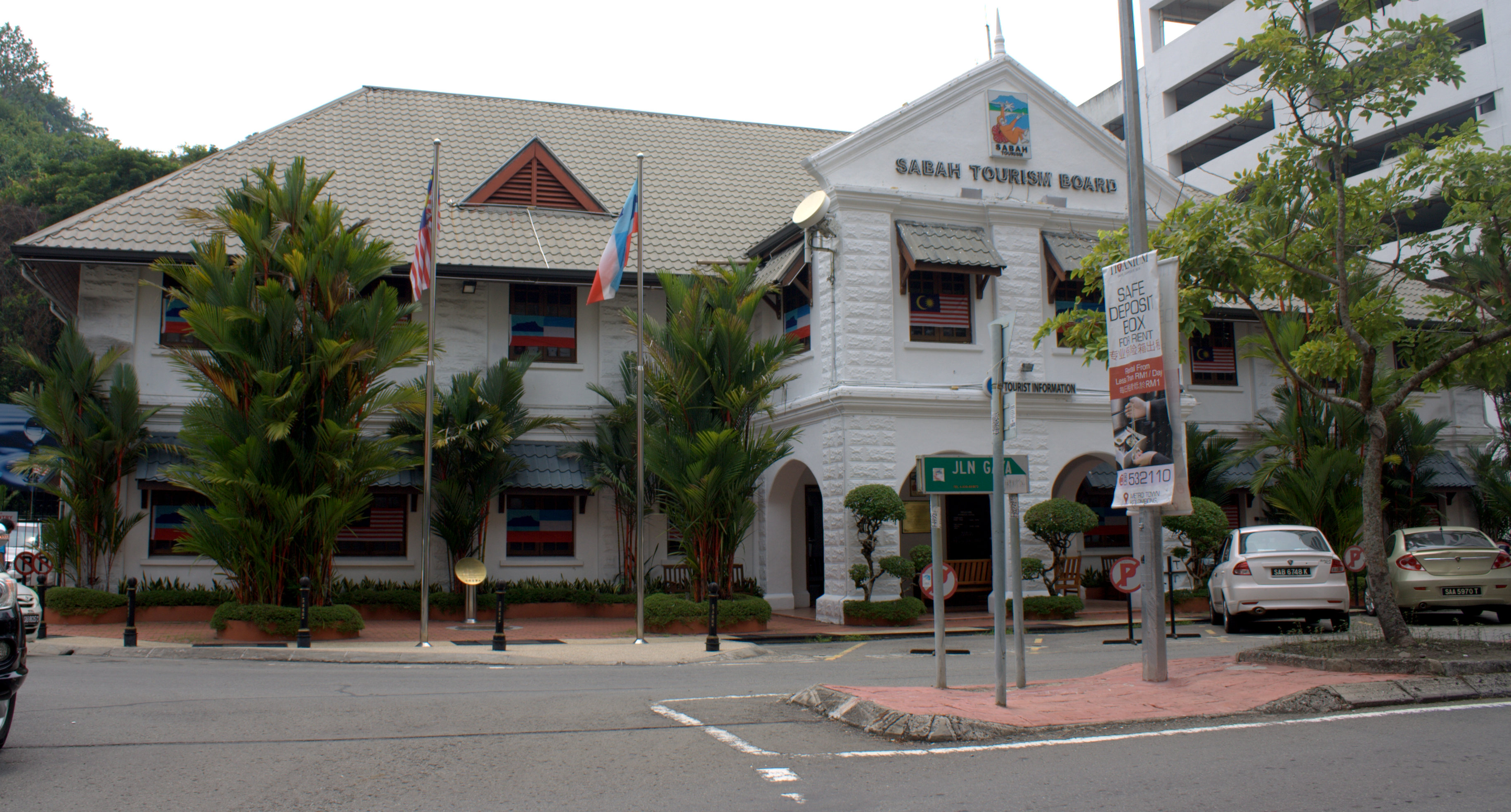
The former Jesselton Post Office building.

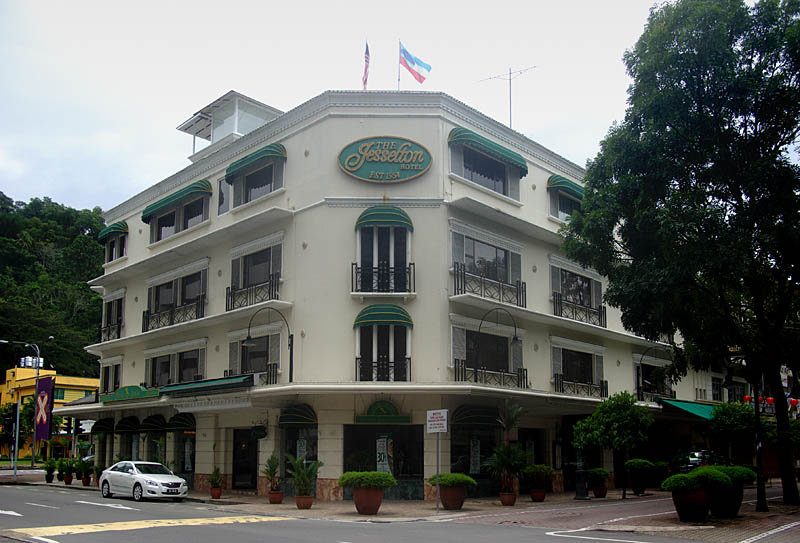
The Jesselton Hotel.

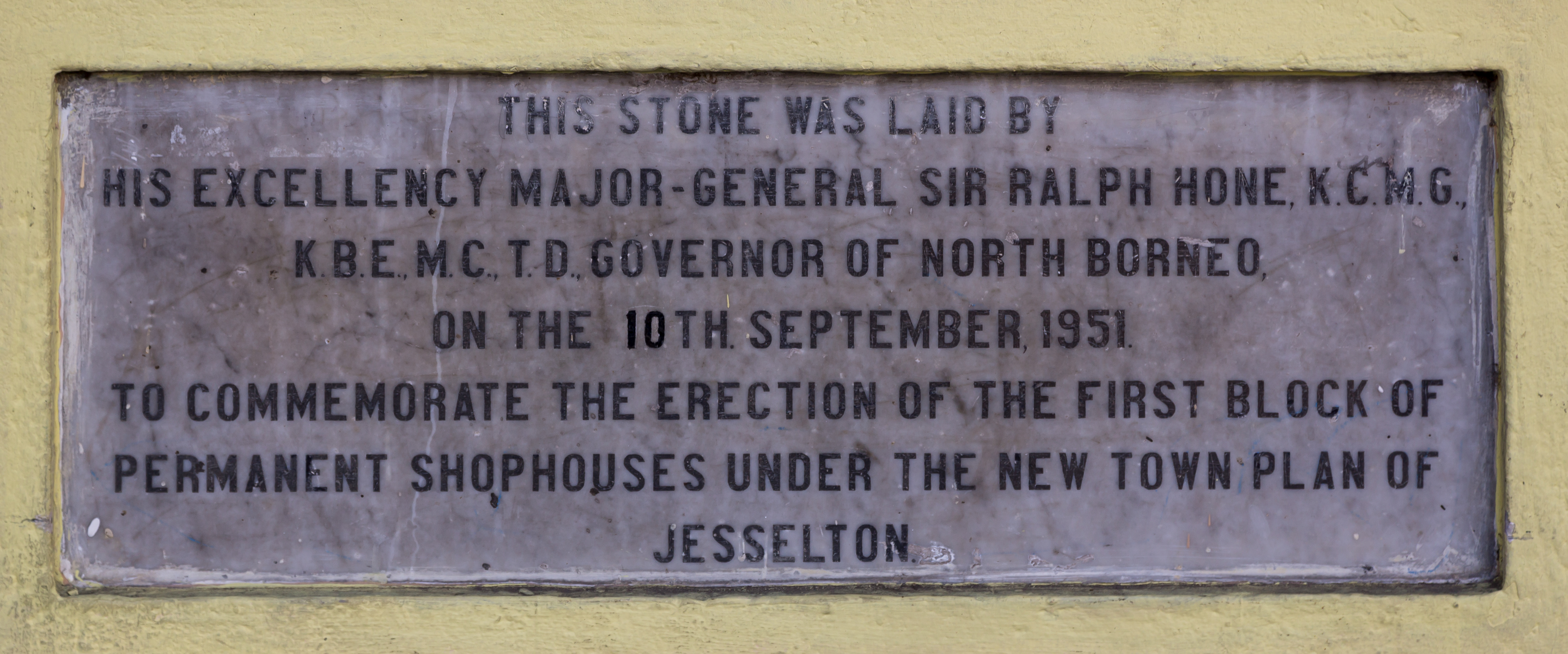
Memorial stone in Gaya Street, laid by the Crown Colony Governor Ralph Hone commemorate the erection of the first block of permanent shophouses under the new town plan of Jesselton.
