= Jesselton Hotel =

Hotel in Kota Kinabalu, Sabah, Malaysia

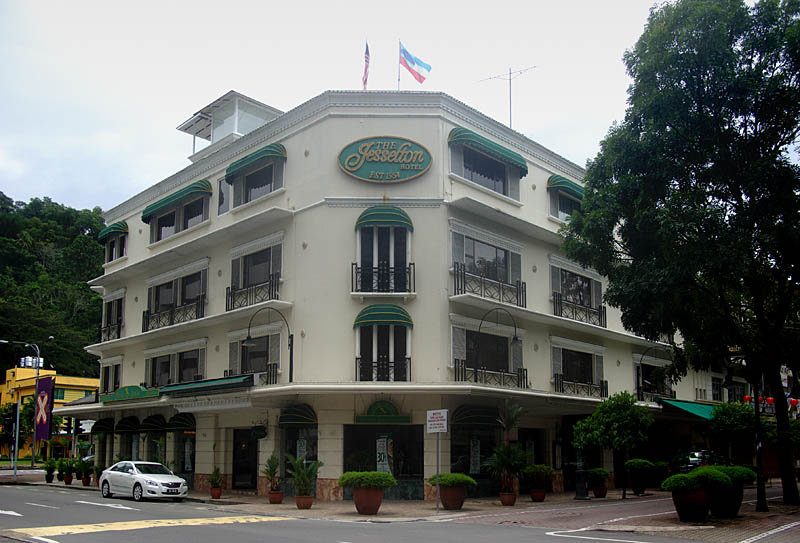
- Interactive map of the Jesselton Hotel area

General information
- Location: Sabah, 69, Gaya Street, P.O. Box 10401, 88000, Kota Kinabalu, Malaysia
- Coordinates: 5°59′5″N 116°4′40″E
- Completed: 1954

Other information
- Number of rooms: 32

Website
- www.jesseltonhotel.com

Jesselton Hotel is a hotel located in the city of Kota Kinabalu, Sabah, Malaysia. It is the first and oldest hotel to be built in the city.

== History ==
Following the devastation of Jesselton (present-day Kota Kinabalu) after the World War II, the British Colonial governor of Jesselton, Sir Herbert Ralph Hone encouraged British Hong Kong Chinese businessmen to invest and rebuild Jesselton town. The hotel was built at the 69 Bond Street (present-day Gaya Street) in 1954. The hotel was then sold to Sabah Chinese leader Khoo Siak Chew who then transferred the hotel management to Wong Tze Fatt, who is the founder of Southeast Asia Gardenia Bread brand. Under the management of Wong, the hotel undergoing a series of renovation.

== Notable guests ==
- Edwina Mountbatten; English heirs, visiting during her reception that was held by the British Governor Roland Turnbull.
- Muhammad Ali; American boxer, visiting after a match in Kuala Lumpur on his way to Manila.
