= Sabah Tourism Board =

Agency of Sabah State Government

- Lembaga Pelancongan Sabah

Agency overview
- Formed: August 1976; 50 years ago
- Jurisdiction: Government of Sabah
- Headquarters: 51, Gaya Street, 88000, Kota Kinabalu, Sabah
- Agency executives: Joniston Bangkuai, Chairman; Julinus Jeffrey Jimit, CEO
- Parent agency: Ministry of Tourism, Culture and Environment
- Website: www.sabahtourism.com

The Sabah Tourism Board (STB; Malay: Lembaga Pelancongan Sabah), or generally known as Sabah Tourism, is an agency of the Sabah State Government operating under the purview of the Ministry of Tourism, Culture and Environment. Sabah Tourism's primary responsibility is the marketing and promotion of tourism for the State.

== History ==
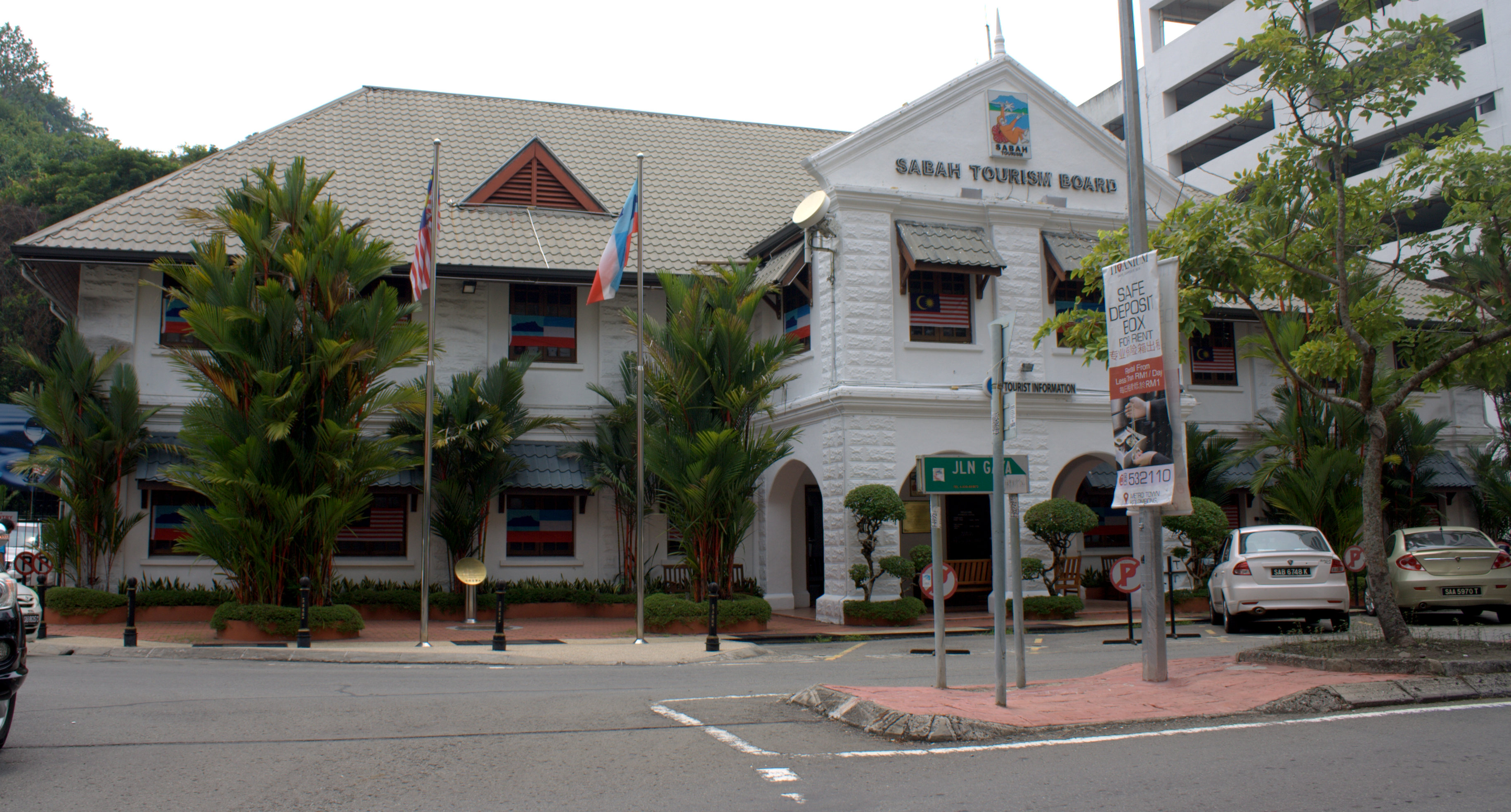
Sabah Tourism's headquarters at Gaya Street, Kota Kinabalu.

The building of the tourism headquarters are formerly a building of the Jesselton Post Office. It was constructed in 1916 by a printing company from Sandakan using wood and officiated by the Governor of North Borneo at the time Aylmer Cavendish Pearson on 16 March 1918.

The building was then renovated in 1936 as a headquarters for audit, treasury, post and bank offices, designed and supervised by JW Norman, an executive engineer with the Public Works Department with the building wall changed to stone. During the World War II, the building damaged by the bombings of the Allied forces but was repaired and maintained as the headquarters office. In 1986, it was restored back as a Post Office building and by 1987, the Malaysian federal government ministry take over the building for the headquarters of the state tourism board and information centre.

On 16 March 2011, a plaque known as "Kilometre Zero" was installed by the state Royal Institute of Surveyors on the floor in front of the building to mark the place as the starting point of all places in the state as the building once served as a post office.

On 23 February 2018, it is one of 24 heritage sites in the state that were gazetted by Sabah's State Heritage Council under new enactment of "State Heritage Enactment 2017".

=== Establishment ===
Sabah Tourism Board was established in August 1976 as the Sabah Tourism Promotion Corporation (STPC). The board then upgraded into a statutory body and took its present name in November 1985.

Sabah Tourism's primary task is to increase tourist arrivals to Sabah, while plays a pivotal role in promoting the state as a premier tourist destination and managing its tourism-related activities. It has since expanded its roles to cater the needs of worldwide tourism markets. Its wholly-owned subsidiary, Sri Pelancongan Sabah specialised on event management, publicity and promotion of tourism industry in the state.

== See also ==
- Tourism Malaysia
- Sarawak Tourism Board
