= Joniston Bangkuai =

Malaysian politician and journalist (born 1961)

Yang Berhormat Datuk Joniston Bangkuai PGDK JP MLA

State Assistant Minister to the Chief Minister of Sabah
- Incumbent
- Assumed office 2 December 2025 Serving with Isnin Aliasnih & Ceasar Mandela Malakun
- Governor: Musa Aman
- Chief Minister: Hajiji Noor
- Preceded by: Abidin Madingkir
- Constituency: Kiulu

Chairman of the Sabah Tourism Board
- Incumbent
- Assumed office 20 December 2020
- Chief Minister: Hajiji Noor
- State Minister: Jafry Arifin (2020–2023, since 2025); Christina Liew Chin Jin (2023–2025)
- Chief Executive Officer: Noredah Othman (2020–2023); Julinus Jeffery Jimit (since 2024)

State Assistant Minister of Tourism, Culture and Environment of Sabah
- In office 8 October 2020 – 30 November 2025
- Governor: Juhar Mahiruddin (2020–2024); Musa Aman (2025)
- Chief Minister: Hajiji Noor
- State Minister: Jafry Arifin (2020–2023); Christina Liew Chin Jin (2023–2025)
- Preceded by: Assaffal P. Alian
- Succeeded by: Andi Rizal
- Constituency: Kiulu

Member of the Sabah State Legislative Assembly for Kiulu
- Incumbent
- Assumed office 5 May 2013
- Preceded by: Louis Rampas (BN–PBS)
- Majority: 44 (2013); 1,443 (2018); 1,221 (2020); 1,437 (2025)

Deputy President of the United Sabah Party (Non-Muslim Bumiputera)
- Incumbent
- Assumed office 27 September 2026 Serving with: Ruslan Muharam (Muslim Bumiputera) &; Lo Su Fui (Chinese)
- President: Joachim Gunsalam
- Preceded by: Joachim Gunsalam

1st Information Chief of Gabungan Rakyat Sabah
- Incumbent
- Assumed office 4 March 2022
- Chairman: Hajiji Noor
- Preceded by: Position established

Information Chief of the United Sabah Party
- In office 1 July 2022 – 26 September 2026
- President: Maximus Ongkili (2022–2024); Joachim Gunsalam (Acting) (2024–2026)
- Assistant: Bonaventure Boniface
- Preceded by: Julita Mojungki
- Succeeded by: Bonaventure Boniface

Secretary-General of the United Sabah Party
- In office 3 January 2021 – 30 June 2022
- President: Maximus Ongkili
- Assistant: Hendrus Anding
- Preceded by: Jahid Jahim
- Succeeded by: Julita Mojungki

Personal details
- Born: Joniston bin Lumai Bangkuai; 17 April 1961 (age 65) Kiulu, Tuaran, Crown Colony of North Borneo (now Sabah, Malaysia)
- Citizenship: Malaysia
- Party: United Sabah Party (PBS)
- Other political affiliations: Barisan Nasional (BN) (until 2018); Gabungan Rakyat Sabah (GRS) (since 2020)
- Spouse: Lucy Irene Yong
- Education: University of Technology Malaysia (Masters)
- Occupation: Politician
- Profession: Journalist
- Joniston Bangkuai on Facebook

Joniston Bangkuai (born 17 April 1962) is a Malaysian politician and journalist who has served as State Assistant Minister to the Chief Minister of Sabah in the Gabungan Rakyat Sabah (GRS) coalition under Chief Minister Hajiji Noor since December 2025, State Assistant Minister of Tourism, Culture and Environment of Sabah under Ministers Jafry Ariffin and Christina Liew Chin Jin from October 2020 until November 2025 and Chairman of the Sabah Tourism Board (STB) since December 2020, as well as Member of Sabah State Legislative Assembly (MLA) for Kiulu since May 2013. He is a member of the United Sabah Party (PBS), a component party of the GRS coalition. He served as the Secretary-General of PBS from January 2021 to June 2022, Information Chief of PBS from July 2022 until September 2026 and currently serving as the Deputy President of PBS for the Non-Muslim Bumiputera quota since September 2026.

== Career ==
Before entering politics full-time in 2013, Joniston Bangkuai spent more than three decades as a prominent mainstream journalist, making him one of Sabah's most well-known media figures.

== Election results ==
Parliament of Malaysia
Year	Constituency	Candidate	Votes	Pct	Opponent(s)	Votes	Pct	Ballots cast	Majority	Turnout
2022	P170 Tuaran	Joniston Bangkuai (PBS)	24,710	42.44%	Wilfred Madius Tangau (UPKO)	24,943	42.84%	58,227	233	69.80%
2022	P170 Tuaran	Joniston Bangkuai (PBS)	24,710	42.44%	Jo-Anna Sue Henley Rampas (WARISAN)	5,728	9.84%	58,227	233	69.80%
2022	P170 Tuaran	Joniston Bangkuai (PBS)	24,710	42.44%	Noortaip Suhaili @ Sualee (IND)	2,008	3.45%	58,227	233	69.80%
2022	P170 Tuaran	Joniston Bangkuai (PBS)	24,710	42.44%	Muminin B. Norbinsha (PEJUANG)	445	0.76%	58,227	233	69.80%
2022	P170 Tuaran	Joniston Bangkuai (PBS)	24,710	42.44%	Boby Lewat (IND)	393	0.67%	58,227	233	69.80%

Sabah State Legislative Assembly
Year	Constituency	Candidate	Votes	Pct	Opponent(s)	Votes	Pct	Ballots cast	Majority	Turnout
2013	N11 Kiulu	Joniston Bangkuai (PBS)	3,745	41.08%	Rhodes Panilau (PKR)	3,701	40.60%	9,288	44	81.50%
2013	N11 Kiulu	Joniston Bangkuai (PBS)	3,745	41.08%	Terence Sinti (STAR)	1,025	11.24%	9,288	44	81.50%
2013	N11 Kiulu	Joniston Bangkuai (PBS)	3,745	41.08%	John Hussein (IND)	517	5.67%	9,288	44	81.50%
2013	N11 Kiulu	Joniston Bangkuai (PBS)	3,745	41.08%	Tindil Gonsobil (SAPP)	129	1.41%	9,288	44	81.50%
2018	N11 Kiulu	Joniston Bangkuai (PBS)	4,336	42.39%	Jo-Anna Sue Henley Rampas (WARISAN)	2,893	28.28%	10,459	1,443	80.70%
2018	N11 Kiulu	Joniston Bangkuai (PBS)	4,336	42.39%	Terence Sinti (STAR)	2,457	24.02%	10,459	1,443	80.70%
2018	N11 Kiulu	Joniston Bangkuai (PBS)	4,336	42.39%	Gaibin Ransoi (PCS)	543	5.31%	10,459	1,443	80.70%
2020	N15 Kiulu	Joniston Bangkuai (PBS)	4,007	51.93%	Wilfred Madius Tangau (UPKO)	2,786	36.11%	7,716	1,221	70.87%
2020	N15 Kiulu	Joniston Bangkuai (PBS)	4,007	51.93%	Andau Yasun @ Bruno (PCS)	363	4.70%	7,716	1,221	70.87%
2020	N15 Kiulu	Joniston Bangkuai (PBS)	4,007	51.93%	Rozylyn @ Rosalyn Gelunu (LDP)	274	3.55%	7,716	1,221	70.87%
2020	N15 Kiulu	Joniston Bangkuai (PBS)	4,007	51.93%	Dominic Yasun (IND)	266	3.45%	7,716	1,221	70.87%
2020	N15 Kiulu	Joniston Bangkuai (PBS)	4,007	51.93%	Jolianis Lampog (IND)	20	0.26%	7,716	1,221	70.87%
2025	N15 Kiulu	Joniston Bangkuai (PBS)	4,316	36.51%	Terence Sinti (STAR)	2,879	24.35%	11,935	1,437	69.53%
2025	N15 Kiulu	Joniston Bangkuai (PBS)	4,316	36.51%	Joisin Romut (UPKO)	2,736	23.14%	11,935	1,437	69.53%
2025	N15 Kiulu	Joniston Bangkuai (PBS)	4,316	36.51%	Henry Saimpon (KDM)	1,192	10.08%	11,935	1,437	69.53%
2025	N15 Kiulu	Joniston Bangkuai (PBS)	4,316	36.51%	Saibin Gunsari (WARISAN)	389	3.29%	11,935	1,437	69.53%
2025	N15 Kiulu	Joniston Bangkuai (PBS)	4,316	36.51%	Trevor Maringking (ANAK NEGERI)	176	1.49%	11,935	1,437	69.53%
2025	N15 Kiulu	Joniston Bangkuai (PBS)	4,316	36.51%	Niyky @ Niky J Bosikol (IMPIAN)	78	0.66%	11,935	1,437	69.53%
2025	N15 Kiulu	Joniston Bangkuai (PBS)	4,316	36.51%	Dusi Gingging (PKS)	56	0.47%	11,935	1,437	69.53%

== Honours ==
- Sabah
  - Commander of the Order of Kinabalu (PGDK) – Datuk (2006)
  - Justice of the Peace (JP) (2011)
