= Sepilok Orangutan Rehabilitation Centre =

Wildlife sanctuary in Malaysia

Coordinates: 5.86501°N 117.94939°E

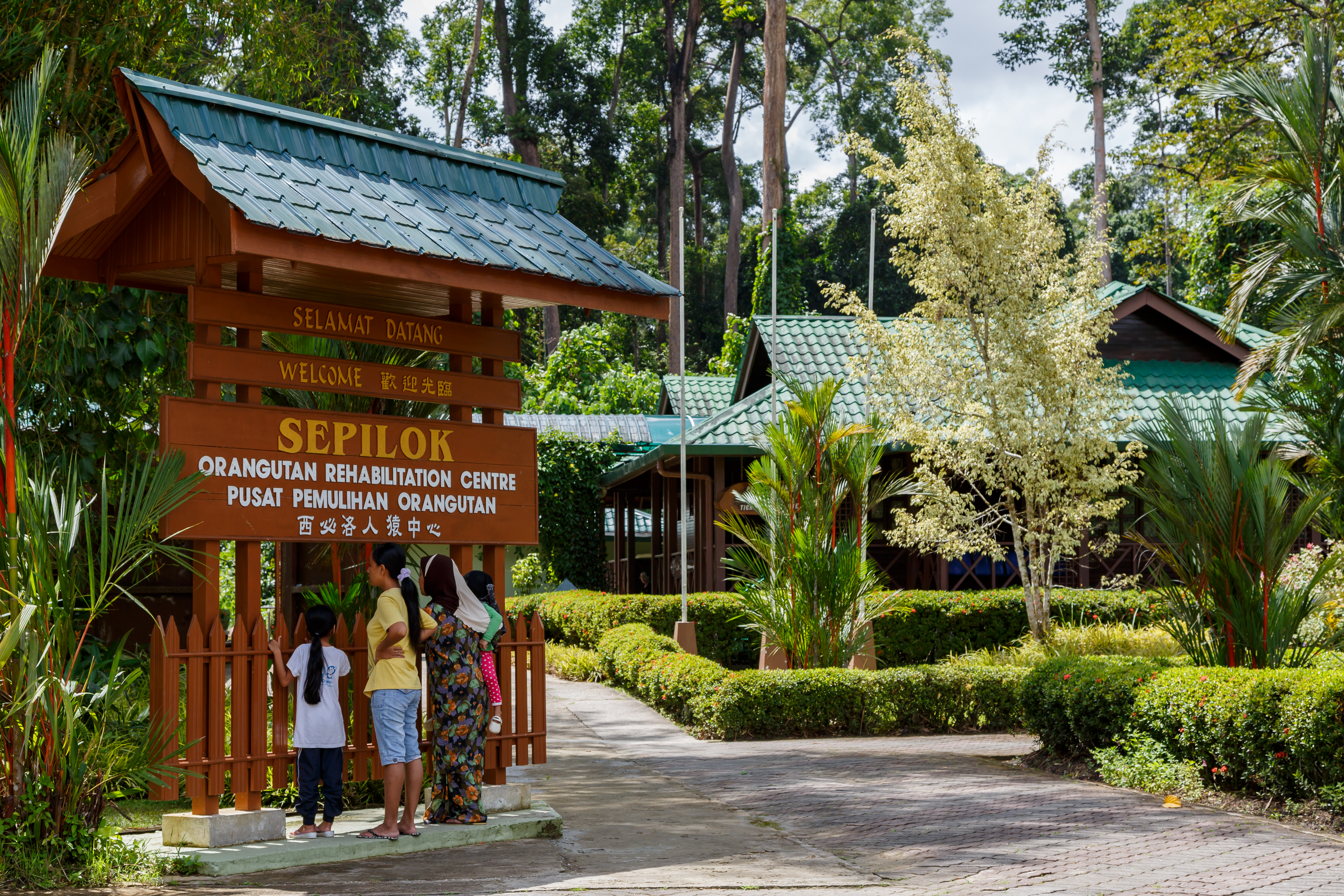
The Sepilok Orangutan Rehabilitation Centre main gateway

Sepilok Orangutan Rehabilitation Centre is located about 25 kilometres west of Sandakan in the state of Sabah, Malaysia.

The centre opened in 1964 as the first official orangutan rehabilitation project for rescued orphaned baby orangutans from logging sites, plantations, or illegal hunting, along with those formerly kept as pets. The orphaned orangutans are trained to survive again in the wild and are released as soon as they are ready. The sanctuary is located within the Kabili-Sepilok Forest Reserve which covers an area of 4,294 ha (10,610 acres), much of which is virgin rainforest. The reserve has been designated an Important Bird Area by BirdLife International. Today around 60 to 80 orangutans are living free in the reserve.

The activities of the centre have featured in television series including "Paul O'Grady's Animal Orphans" and Animal Planet's "Meet the Orangutans".

In October 2014, the centre opened a section where visitors can view the nursery area where the younger orangutans first learn to be outside and play on a large climbing frame. This consists of two large indoor seating areas (one with air conditioning and one with fans only) with a large window that overlooks the play area.

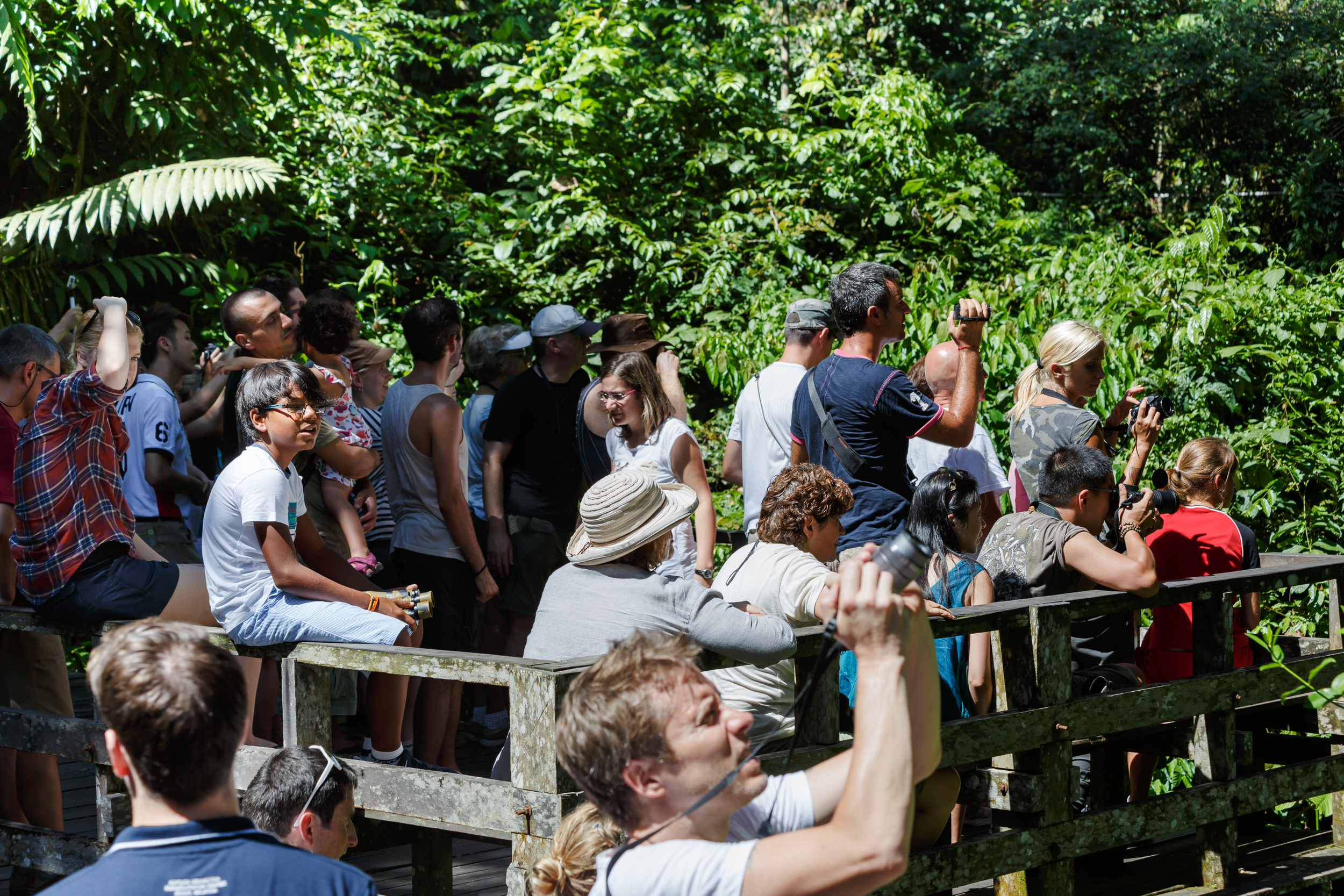
Visitors in the centre

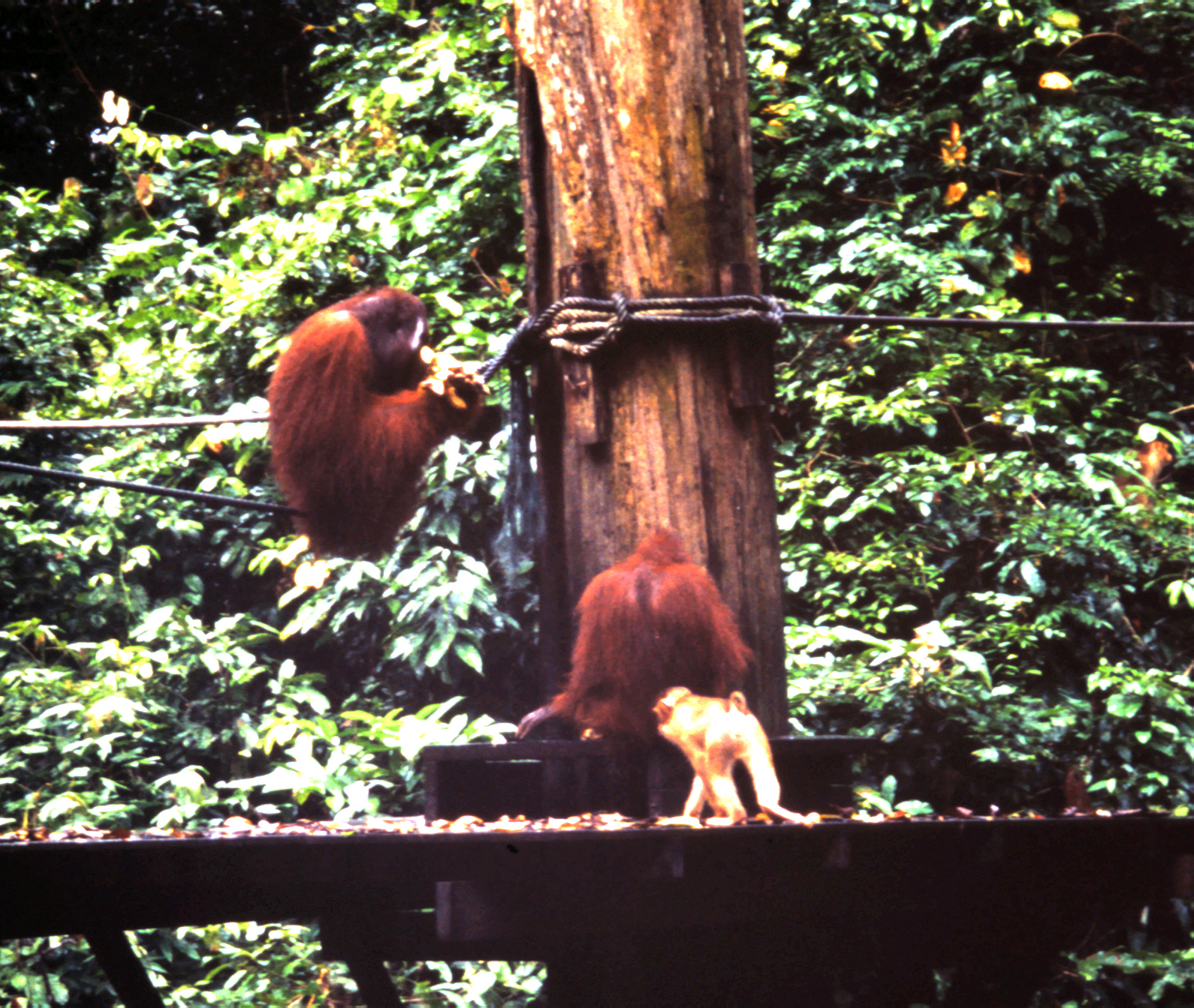
Two orangutans (and one pig-tailed macaque) at Sepilok Orangutan Rehabilitation Centre in 2000

== See also ==
- Among the Great Apes with Michelle Yeoh (Documentary about the Sepilok Orang Utan Sanctuary)
