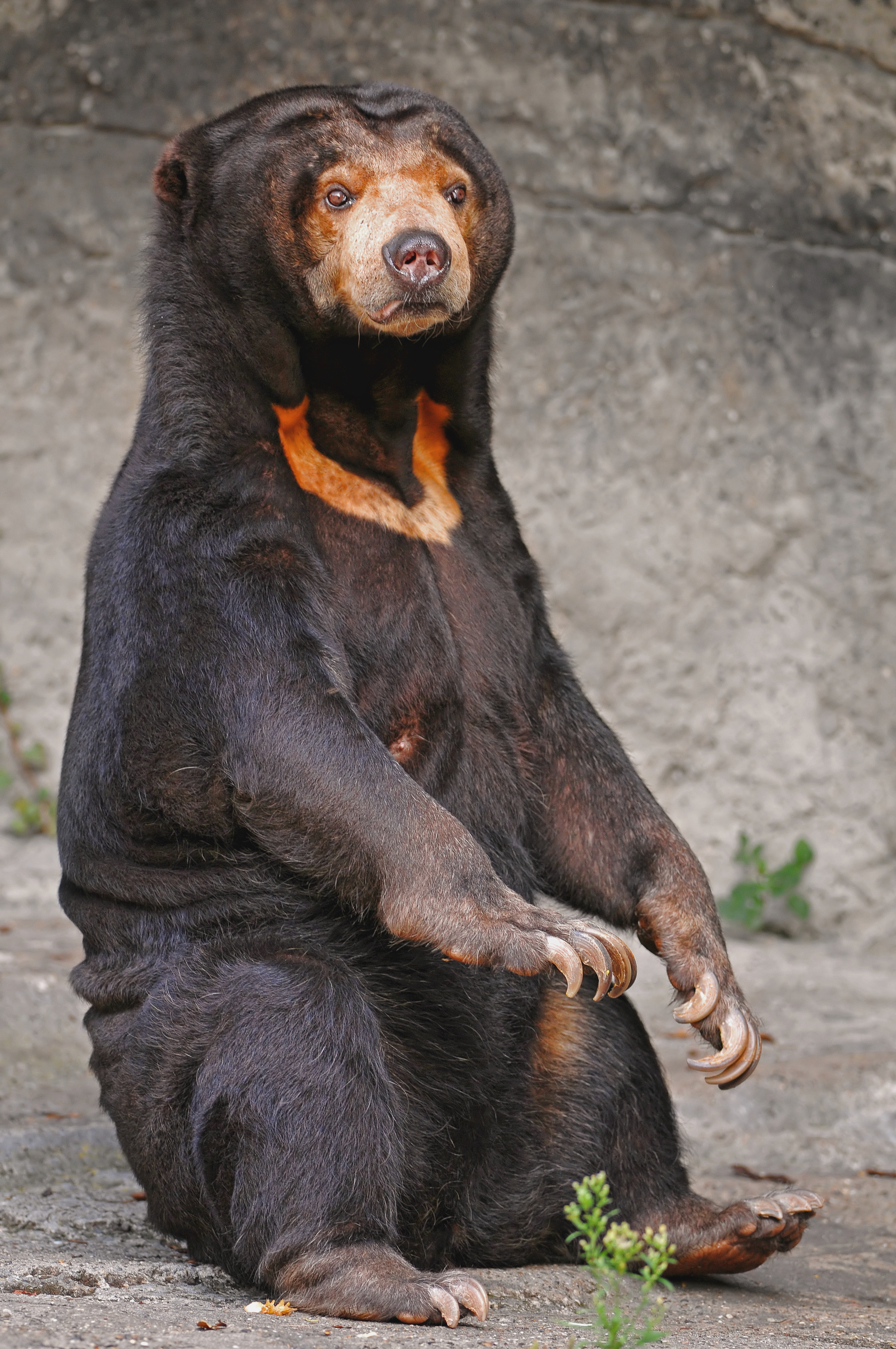
- A female Malayan sun bear sitting in her enclosure of zoo Basel

Scientific classification
- Kingdom: Animalia
- Phylum: Chordata
- Class: Mammalia
- Order: Carnivora
- Family: Ursidae
- Genus: Helarctos
- Species: H. malayanus
- Subspecies: H. m. malayanus

Trinomial name
- Helarctos malayanus malayanus (Raffles, 1821)

= Malayan sun bear =

Subspecies of bear found in tropical forest habitats of Southeast Asia

The Malayan sun bear (Helarctos malayanus malayanus) is a subspecies of sun bear, occurring in southeast Asia. The Malayan sun bear's conservation status is Vulnerable on the IUCN Red List. Its population is decreasing due to threats like habitat loss from deforestation and commercial hunting, primarily for products like bear bile.

== Taxonomy ==
The Malayan sun bear was first described by Stamford Raffles in 1821. The Malayan sun can be found across Malaysia.

== Description ==
Although the sun bear is the smallest species in the bear family, its subspecies, the Malayan sun bear is even smaller, with a maximum length of 1.5 m (4 ft 11 in) and weight of 35–70 kg (77–154 lb). The Malayan sun bear appears very similar to the sun bear, but is distinguishable by its golden-white chest patch, which is thinner than that of the sun bear.

The Malaysian sun bear looks very similar to the island Sun bear subspecies except being much smaller.

== Distribution and habitat ==
The Malayan sun bear can be found in mainly coastal areas in southeast Asia, but is less dispersed within it than the sun bear, with specific populations living as follows:

- Along the India–Myanmar border
- Western peninsular Malaysia
- Western Sumatra
- Inland Borneo
- Inland Indochina

Like the sun bear, the Malayan sun bear lives within rainforests (both evergreen and deciduous) of diverse altitudes, ranging from coastal, lowland areas to mountainous regions of above 2,000 m (6,600 ft).

== Ecology and behavior ==
Unlike the sun bear, the Malayan sun bear is primarily nocturnal, although it is also active in the daytime. However, like the sun bear, they do not hibernate like other bears due to their warm, tropical environment, which provides nutrients all year round.

=== Diet ===
Similarly to the sun bear, the Malayan sun bear is omnivorous and eats fruit, honey, and nuts. The meat in their diet is composed of insects such as termites, bee larvae and beetle larvae. They can reach these foods with their long tongues (which can reach 30 cm (1 ft)) and claws.

== Human relations ==
In 2025, the Malayan sun bear along with the Bornean sun bear (Helarctos malayanus euryspilus), were selected to be new campaign mascots for Visit Malaysia Year 2026.
