= Sabah Wildlife Department =

Sabah Wildlife Department, a local wildlife authority under Sabah's state Ministry for Tourism Development, Environment, Science and Technology, enforces the "Wildlife Conservation Enactment 1997" for the proper regulation, use, protection, conservation and management of wildlife, caves and wildlife areas in Sabah. Headquartered in Kota Kinabalu, Malaysia, jurisdiction is spread amongst district offices:

- Keningau Wildlife District
- Lahad Datu Wildlife District
- Sandakan Wildlife District
- Tawau Wildlife District
- West Coast & Kudat Wildlife District

The Department is responsible for:

- Farming
- Filming
- Guides
- Honorary Wildlife Wardens
- Licensure
- Publications
- Research management
- Tour operators
- Trade
- Zoos
