= Malaysia in World War II =

Malaysia in World War II may refer to:

- Japanese occupation of Malaya
- Japanese occupation of British Borneo
