= Sandakan Massacre Memorial =

- Tugu Peringatan Pembunuhan Beramai-ramai Sandakan
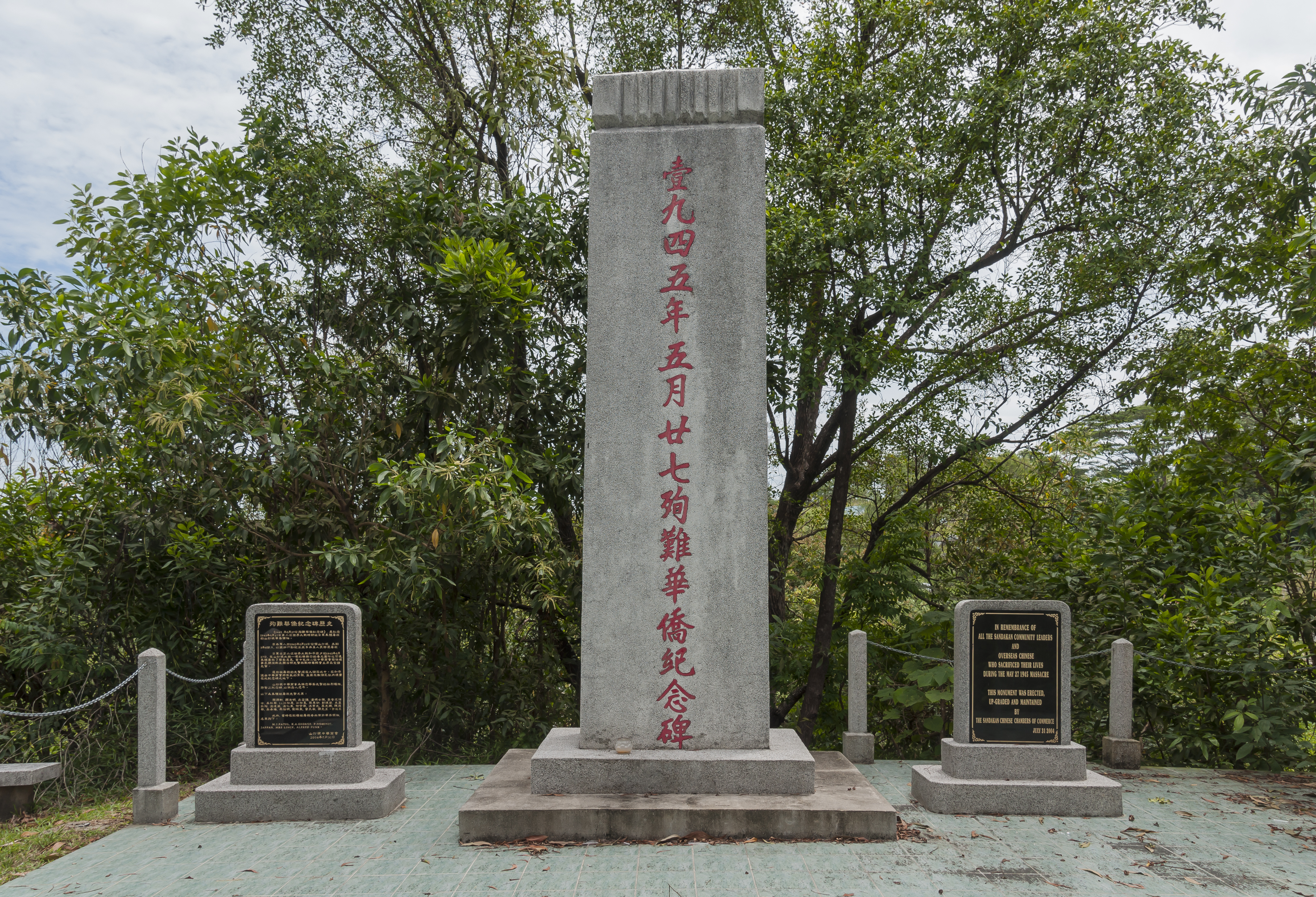
- The three monuments.
- Interactive map of Sandakan Massacre Memorial
- Location: Sandakan
- Coordinates: 5°30′36″N 118°07′13″E
- Dedicated to: Sandakan underground movement, consisting mostly of Chinese people

Sandakan Massacre Memorial (Malay: Tugu Peringatan Pembunuhan Beramai-ramai Sandakan) consists of three monuments which commemorate 30 Chinese victims, most of the members are local elite of an underground movement who been executed on 27 May 1945 along with several other victims during the Japanese occupation of North Borneo. The memorial was built on the spot where the massacre took place and where the victims were buried. It is located near a Chinese cemetery on a hill above the old town centre of Sandakan.

== History ==
Near the end of 1945, it became clear that Japan would lose the war. The Japanese occupation began in Sandakan with the arrest of the town leader. On the orders of the officer on duty during the time, Taisa Machiguchi Taku by the responsible Borneo Kempeitai on 6 May 1945, Kwan Yun Hin, the former chairman of the Chinese Chamber of Commerce Sandakan and representative of the Chinese population in British North Borneo together with seven other persons was arrested. (Note: The reason for the detention of Kwan was due to his role in the China Relief Fund, an organisation formed since 1937 to funds the war against the Japanese in China, along with its support for the North Borneo Chartered Company.)

After an Allied raid on 27 May, where a three-hour bombardment by five or six PT boat, speed boats landed at the port of Sandakan. Some of the town officials met with US soldiers. However, as the US boats left the town in the same night, the Japanese took a chance with already 27 persons in custody; most of them belonged to the Chinese leadership of the town. Those arrested were taken to the headquarters of the Kempeitai. On the basis of alleged confessions, they were convicted in absentia by the District Court of Sandakan. After the reading of the judgement by Captain Nakata Shiruchi, the group been led up to a hill behind the headquarters and shot in groups of four with a machine gun. Other sources indicate that the convicts were beheaded. Even before the execution there were ten burrows dug in which the bodies of the men were buried.

In addition to the Chinese victims, other nationalities were among the victims:

- MS Patel, the owner of a pharmacy in Sandakan.
- Mrs. Linck, the wife of the German pharmacist employed there.
- KA George, a member of the town council.
- Richard Watson, accountants.
- Dominic P., retired customs officer.
- Alfred Funk, co-owner of Radio & Sons.
- Jappar, dealer.

Together with an Indian doctor. Not all those executed are known by name. It is generally believed that the number of victims is far greater than the recorded list of names on the memorial stone.

Shortly after the war, the town residents erected a monument for all victims of the occupation in Sandakan. This memorial located on a square in front of today's District Office, it was inaugurated by the British Governor-General of Malaya and British Borneo, Sir Malcolm MacDonald on 17 September 1946. In 2004, the monument was renovated and expanded to include the two monument stones. The maintenance and care is still in the hands of the Chinese Chamber of Commerce Sandakan. The opening of the memorial will be held each year on 27 May, organised by the descendants of the victims.

From all the Japanese officers during their service in North Borneo, 420 were indicted for war crimes. Among those who were sentenced to death is Captain Nakata Shiruchi of the Sandakan Kempeitai.

== Description ==
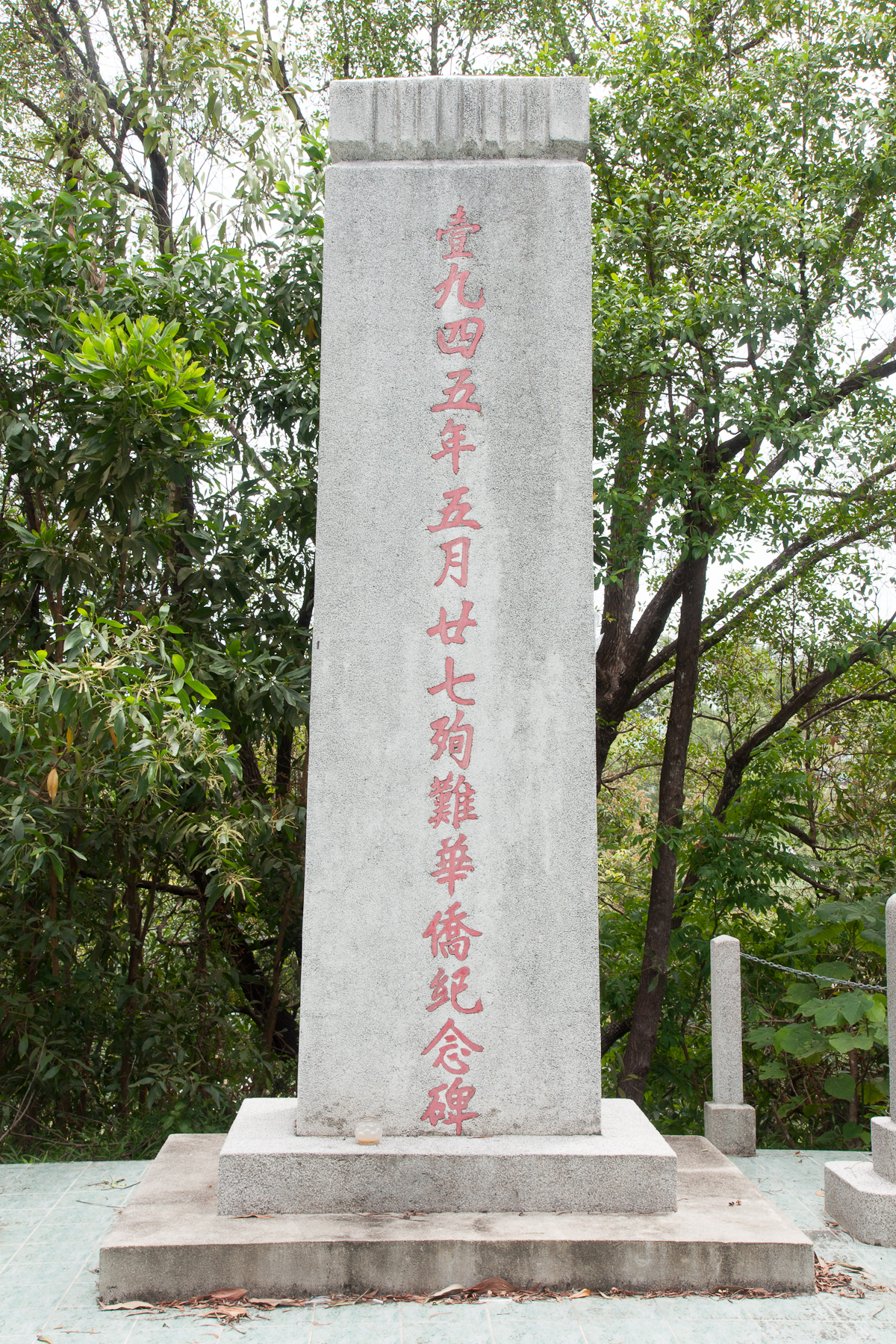
Centre monument.

The memorial is located near the entrance to the Sandakan Chinese Cemetery. Right next to the gate, it is surrounded by a tiled square of six metres long. Link chains connected by stone pillars limit the memorial, which consists of an approximately three metres high stele and two flanking memorial stones.

=== Centre monument ===
The monument in red Chinese characters translated as:

Memorial to the late Chinese on 27 May 1945

=== Left monument ===
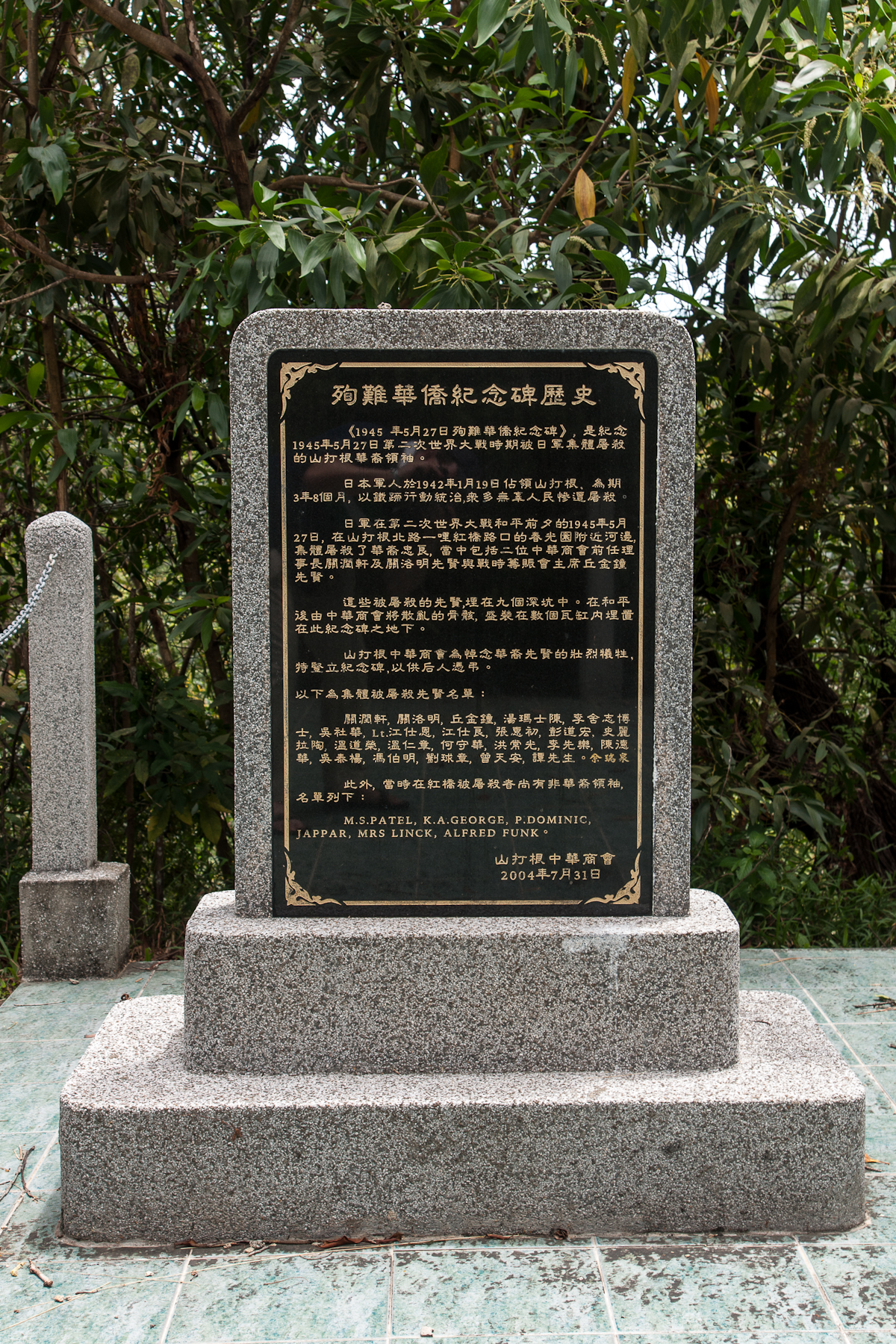
Left monument.

The monument standing in the left listed the names of the executed Chinese people.

=== Right monument ===
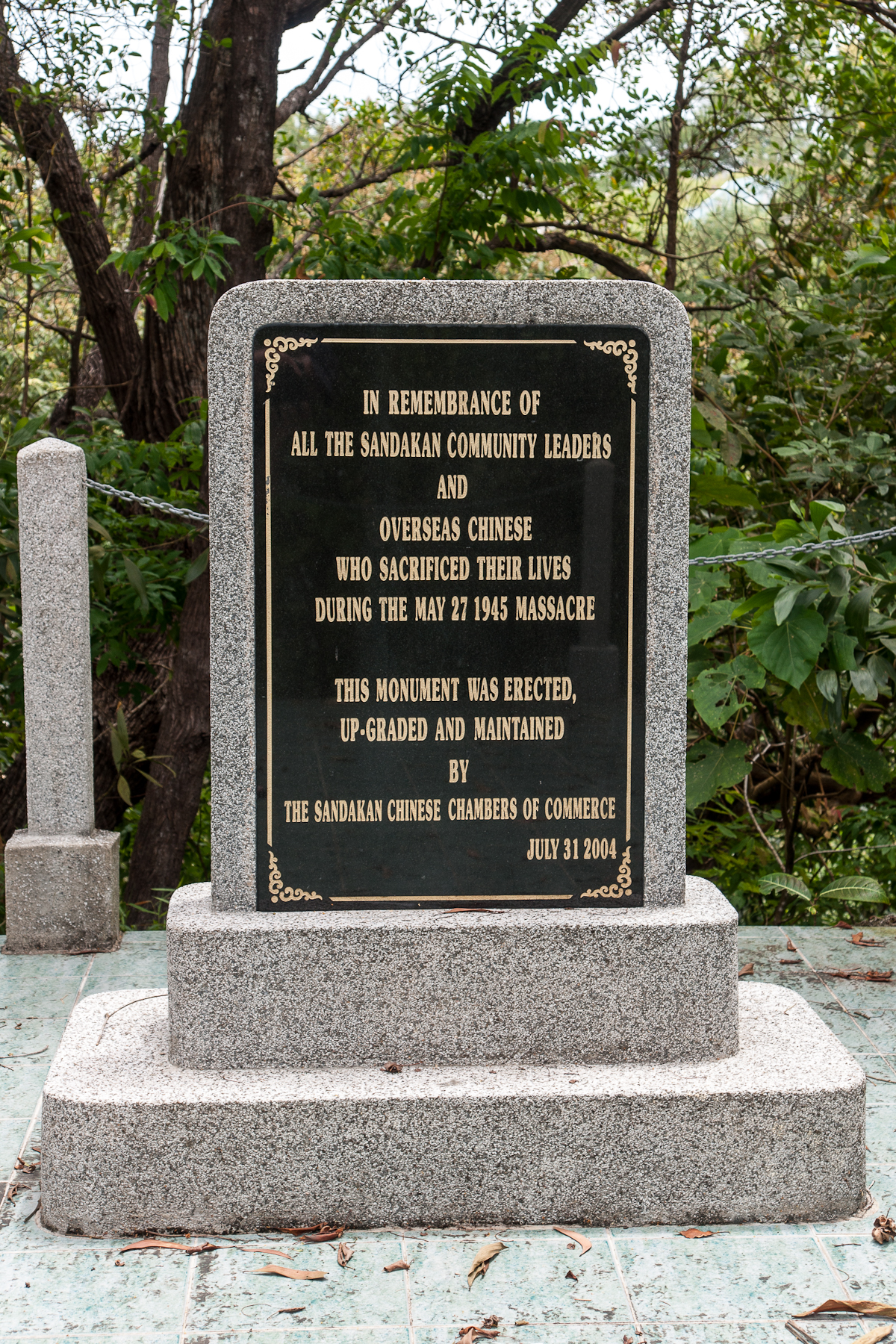
Right monument.

Standing in the right, a monument dated in 31 July 2004 with the inscription:

In Remembrance Of All The Sandakan Community Leaders And Overseas Chinese Who Sacrificed Their Lives During The 27 May 1945 Massacre
This Monument Was Erected, Upgraded And Maintained By The Sandakan Chinese Chambers Of Commerce
