= USS LST-560 =

1944 LST-542-class tank landing ship

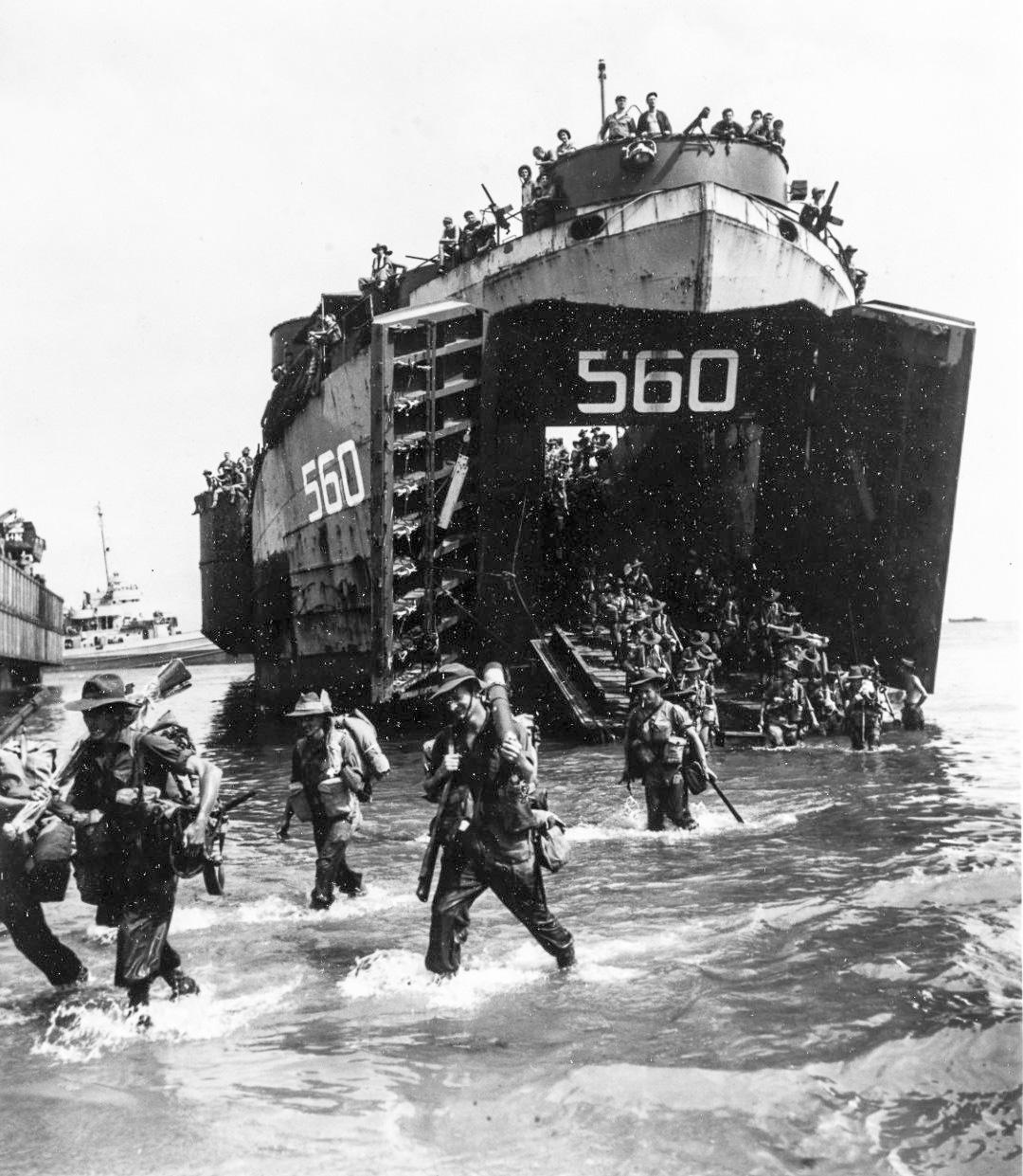
- Australian troops land from USS LST-560, at Labuan Island in Brunei Bay, 10 June 1945.

History

United States
- Name: USS LST-560
- Builder: Missouri Valley Bridge and Iron Company, Evansville, Indiana
- Laid down: 22 February 1944
- Launched: 21 April 1944
- Sponsored by: Mrs. L. C. Holm
- Commissioned: 2 May 1944
- Decommissioned: 17 May 1946
- Stricken: 19 June 1946
- Honors and awards: Two battle stars for World War II
- Fate: Sold 12 September 1946

General characteristics
- Class & type: LST-542-class tank landing ship
- Displacement: 1,625 long tons (1,651 t) light; 4,080 long tons (4,145 t) full (seagoing draft with 1,675-ton load
- Length: 328 ft (100 m)
- Beam: 50 ft (15 m)
- Draft: Unloaded 2 ft 4 in (0.71 m) forward; 7 ft 6 in (2.29 m) aft; Full load: 8 ft 2 in (2.49 m) forward; 14 ft 1 in (4.29 m) aft; Landing with 500-ton load: 3 ft 11 in (1.19 m) forward; 9 ft 10 in (3.00 m) aft
- Installed power: 1,800 horsepower (1.34 megawatts)
- Propulsion: Two 900-horsepower (0.67-megawatt) General Motors 12-567 diesel engines, two shafts, twin rudders
- Speed: 12 knots (22 km/h; 14 mph)
- Range: 24,000 nautical miles (44,448 kilometerss) at 9 knots while displacing 3,960 tons
- Boats & landing craft carried: 2 x LCVPs
- Capacity: 1,600-1,900 tons cargo depending on mission
- Troops: 16 officers, 147 enlisted men
- Complement: 7 officers, 104 enlisted men
- Armament: 2 × twin 40 mm gun mounts; 4 × single 40-millimeter gun mounts; 12 × 20 mm guns

USS LST-560 was a United States Navy LST-542-class tank landing ship in commission from 1944 to 1946.

== Construction and commissioning ==
LST-560 was laid down on 22 February 1944 at Evansville, Indiana, by the Missouri Valley Bridge and Iron Company. She was launched on 21 April 1944, sponsored by Mrs. L. C. Holm, and commissioned on 2 May 1944.

== Service history ==
During World War II, LST-560 was assigned to the Pacific Theater of Operations, where was a unit of LST Division 43 under LST Group 22 (commanded by Commander E. H. Pope, USN), which was a component of LST Flotilla Eight (commanded by Captain E. Watts, USN). She took part in the Philippines campaign, participating in the landings on Palawan Island in March 1945 and the landings in the Visayan Islands in March and April 1945. She then took part in the Brunei Bay operation on Borneo in June 1945.

Following the war, LST-560 performed occupation duty in the Far East until mid-October 1945, when she departed for the United States.

== Decommissioning and disposal ==
After returning to the United States, LST-560 was decommissioned on 17 May 1946 and stricken from the Navy List on 19 June 1946. On 12 September 1946, she was sold to the Construction Power and Merchandising Company of Brooklyn, New York.

== Honors and awards ==
LST-560 earned two battle stars for her World War II service.
