= Quailey's Hill Memorial =

War monument in Ranau District, Sabah, Malaysia

- Tugu Peringatan Bukit Quailey's
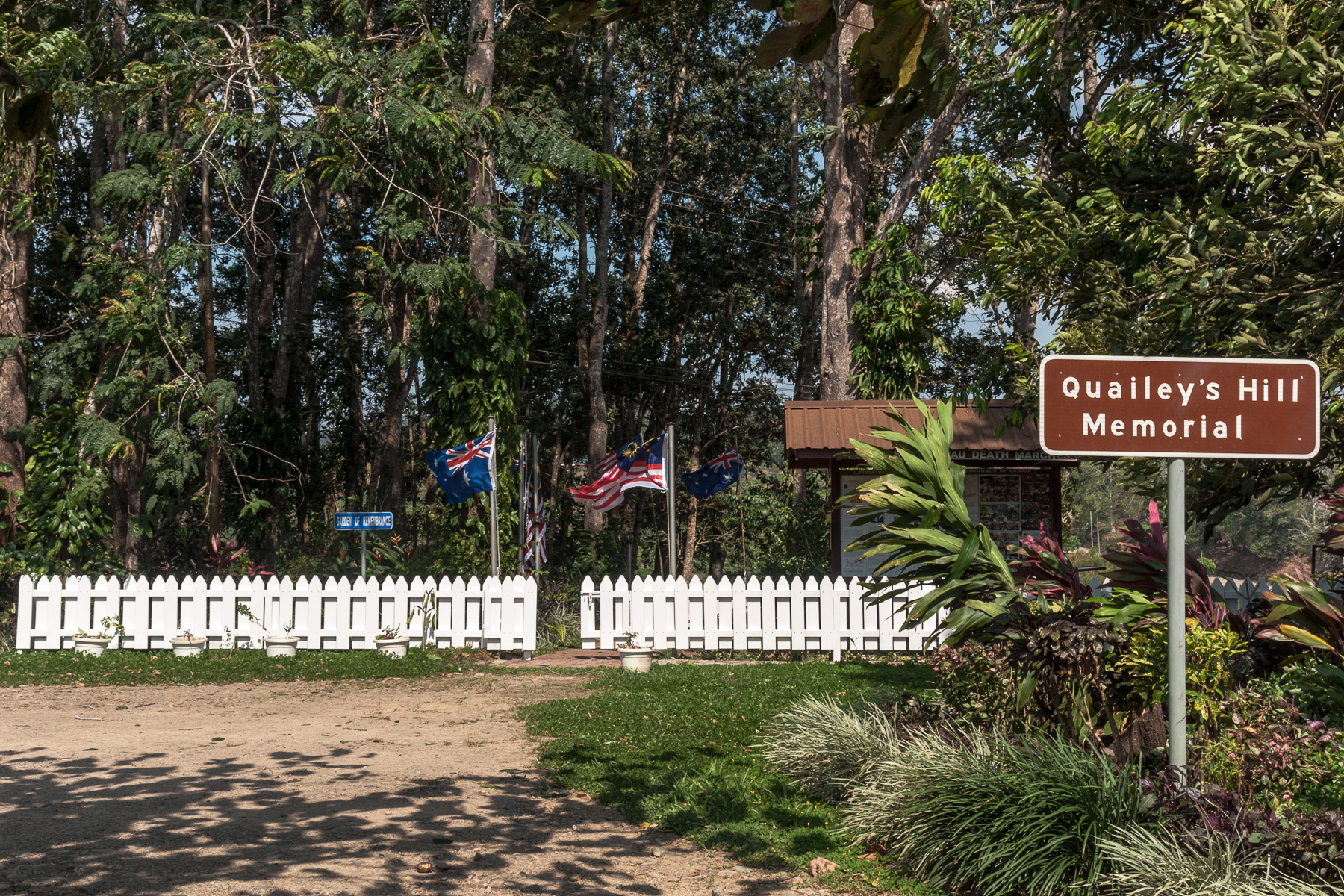
- Gate entrance.
- Interactive map of Quailey's Hill Memorial
- Location: Ranau
- Coordinates: 5°56′44″N 116°46′51″E
- Dedicated to: Allan Quailey Clarence

Quailey's Hill Memorial (Malay: Tugu Peringatan Bukit Quailey's) is a memorial in Ranau District, Sabah, Malaysia. It commemorates an Australian prisoner of war, Allan Quailey, who been killed on 16 February 1945 during the first Sandakan Death Marches by the Japanese soldiers.

== Background ==
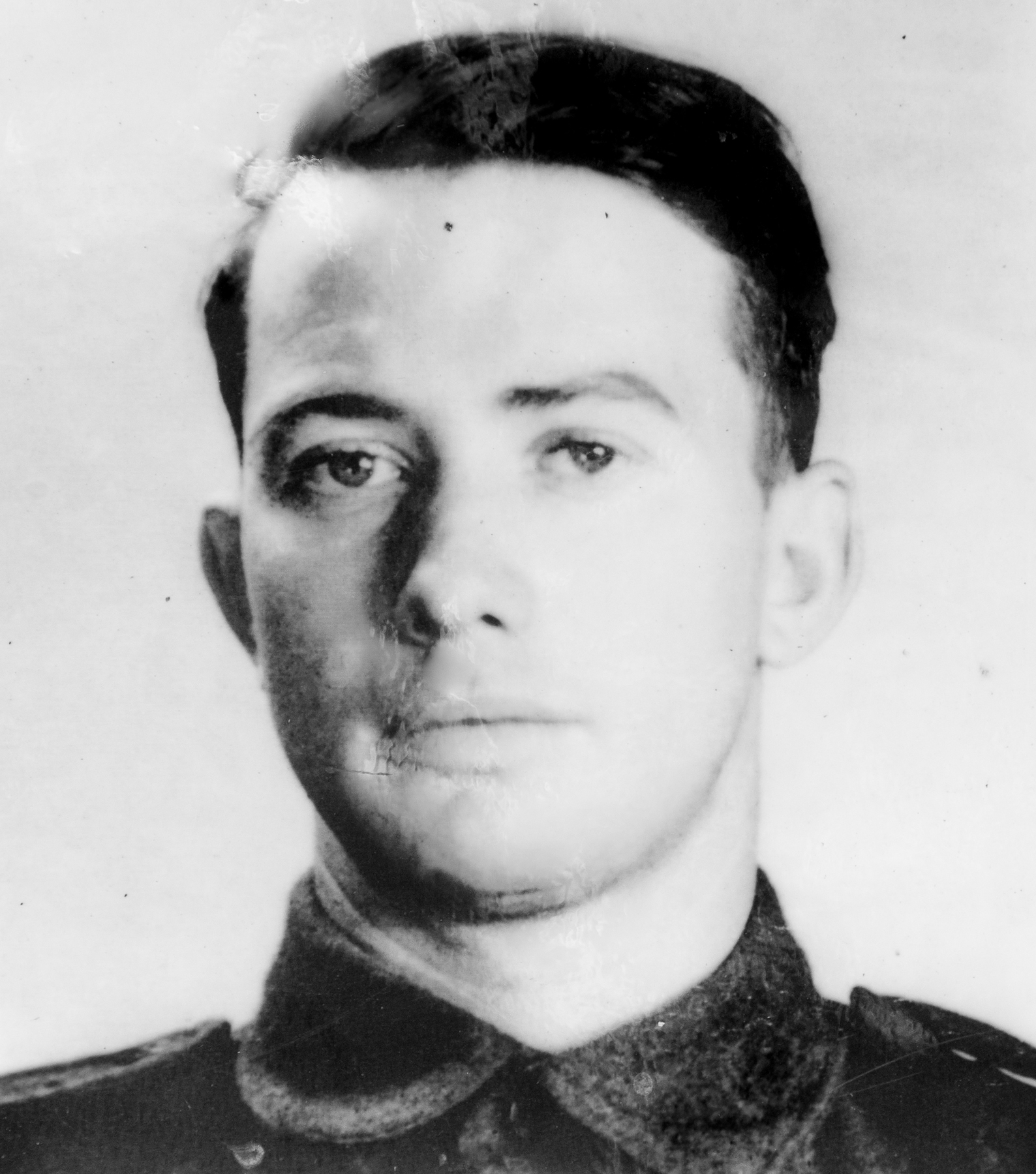
Allan Quailey Clarence, 1920–1945.

Allan Quailey Clarence (born on 8 November 1920 in Lismore, New South Wales, Australia. On 5 August 1941, he joined as a volunteer in the Australian Imperial Force and assigned to the 2/30th Australian Infantry Battalion. With the 8th Division, he then sailed to Malaya but later been captured by the Japanese along with other 15,000 Australians as a prisoner during the fall of Singapore on 15 February 1942 and brought to Changi Prison. In July 1942, he was among the 1,500 Australians who were transferred aboard the SS Yubi Maru to Sandakan. On 31 January 1945, he was sent with other prisoners of war as "Group 3" on the first of the three death marches.

On 16 February, all of his friends in the group noticed that Quaileys would not survive as on a hill he arrived, he refused to go on; knowing the Japanese guards will kill anyone who could not keep up to the hill. Shortly after he was killed by the Japanese, his remains were shortly been keep after the war together with other corpses on a military cemetery in Labuan and buried as an "unknown soldier". Only in 1999, his identity been recovered and a plate with the inscription "Known unto God" been replaced by a personal grave stone.

== History ==
In 2005, an Australian historian Lynette Silver tracked down the original route of the Sandakan Death Marches, together with a Malaysian local trekking experts Tham Yau Kong. They discovered that some of the old-route led through an area today known as where the Sabah Tea Plantation is managed. Based on World War II documents, they could identify the place where the soldier Allan Quailey been killed in February 1945 and proposed to rename the place as "Quailey's Hill". The management of the plantation approved the proposal and also agreed to set up a monument with a granite slab, which explained the circumstances of Quailey's death.

On 14 July 2007, the monument during a ceremony by Masidi Manjun (Minister of Tourism, Culture and Environment of Sabah), Senator Anne McEwen (Senator for South Australia), Lynette Silver and Goh Mung Chwee (Managing Director of Sabah Tea) was inaugurated.

== Location ==
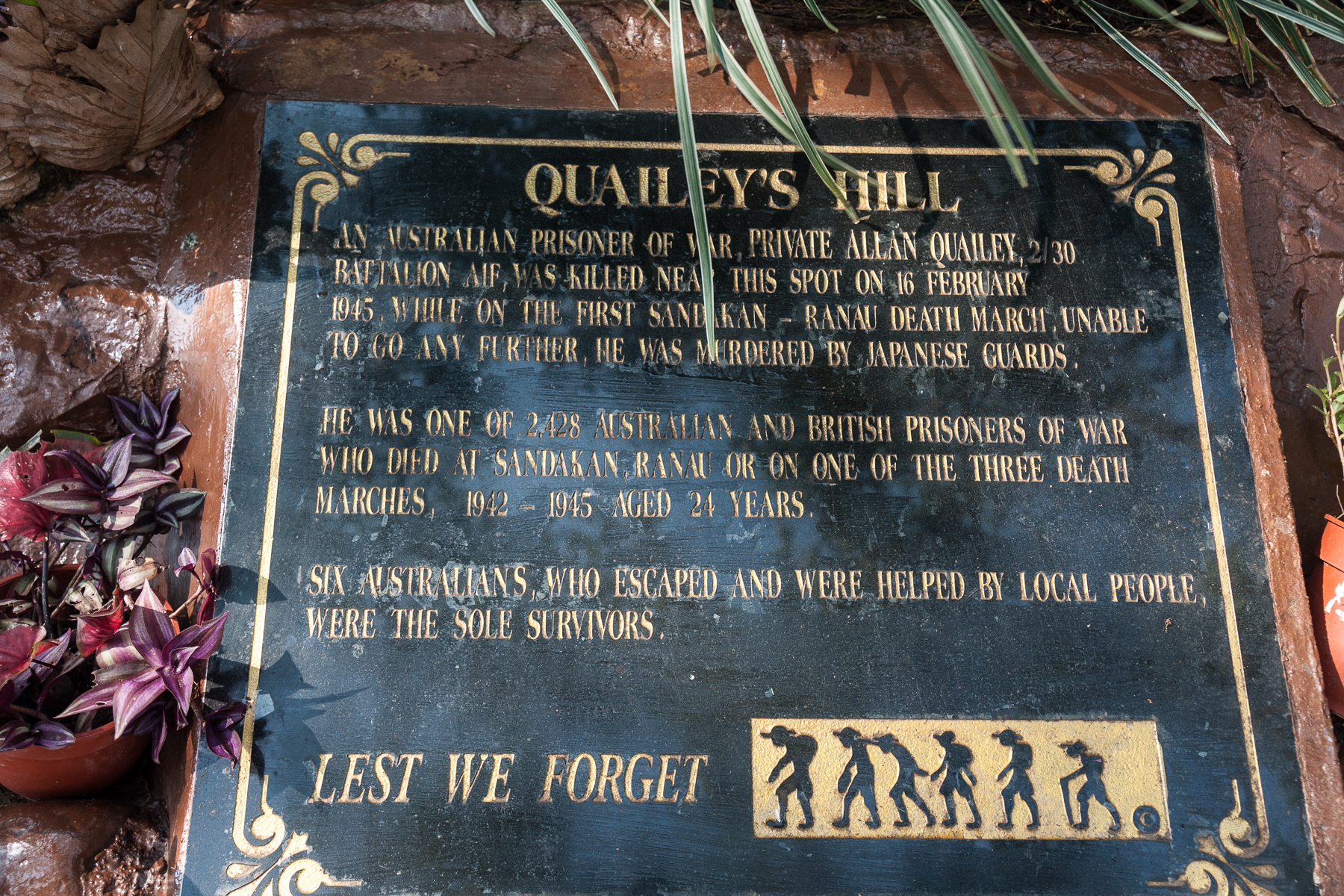
The memorial stone.

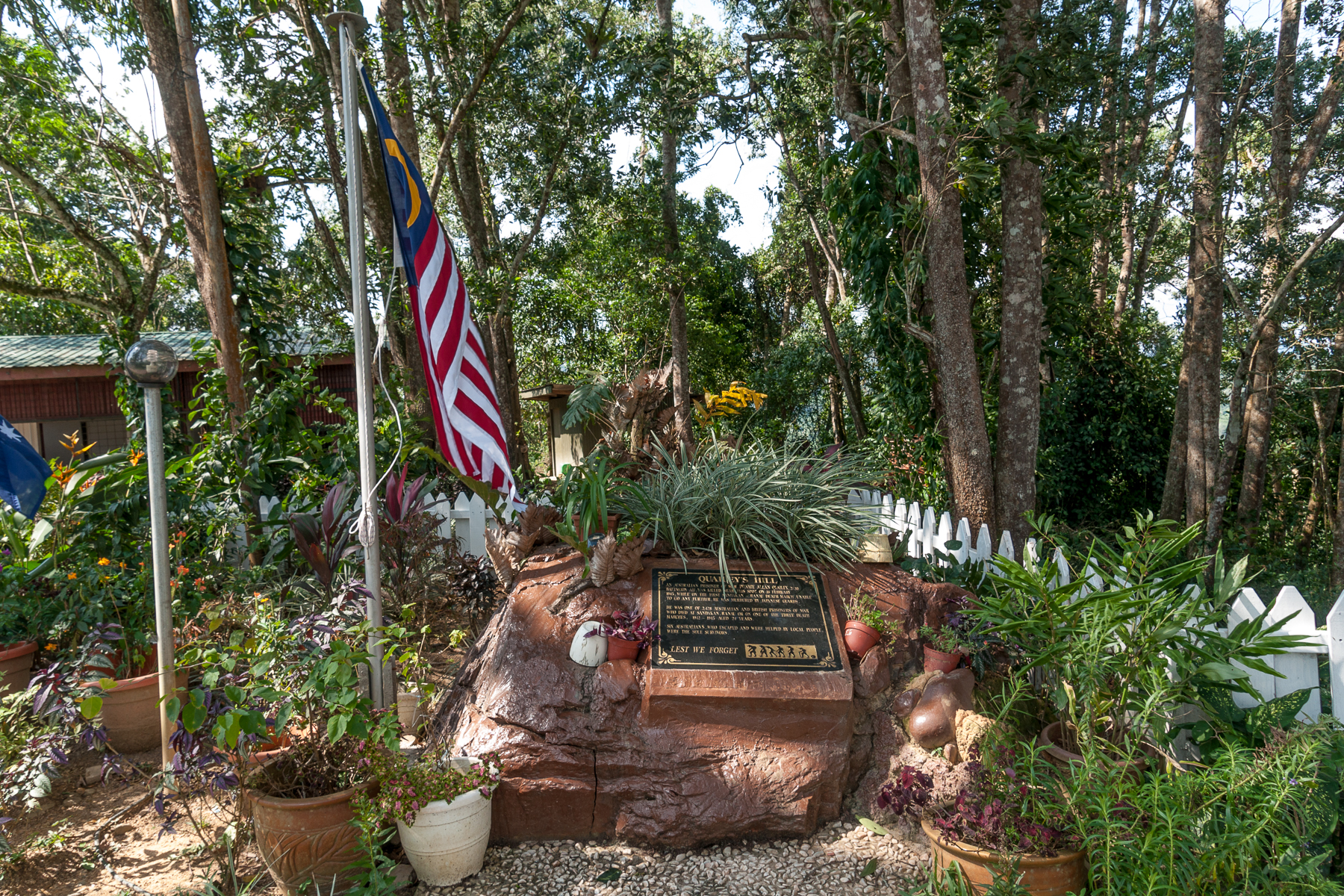
Inside the memorial.

The memorial is located on a hill about seven kilometres east of Sabah within the tea plantation of Sabah Tea Bhd. The grounds and memorial are open to the public.

The monument is located within a delimited with a white fence, tree-lined area of about 100 m². A memorial stone in granite shows in English the following inscription:

QUAILEY'S HILL
An Australian Prisoner of War, Private Allan Quailey, 2/30
Battalion AIF, Was Killed Near This Spot On 16 February
1945, While On The First Sandakan-Ranau Death March. Unable
To Go Any Further, He Was Murdered By Japanese Guards.

He Was One Of The 2.428 Australian And British Prisoners Of War
Who Died At Sandakan, Ranau Or On One Of The Three Death
Marches, 1942–1945 Aged 24 Years.

Six Australians, Who Escaped And Were Helped By Local People,
Were The Sole Survivors

LEST WE FORGET

== POW route ==
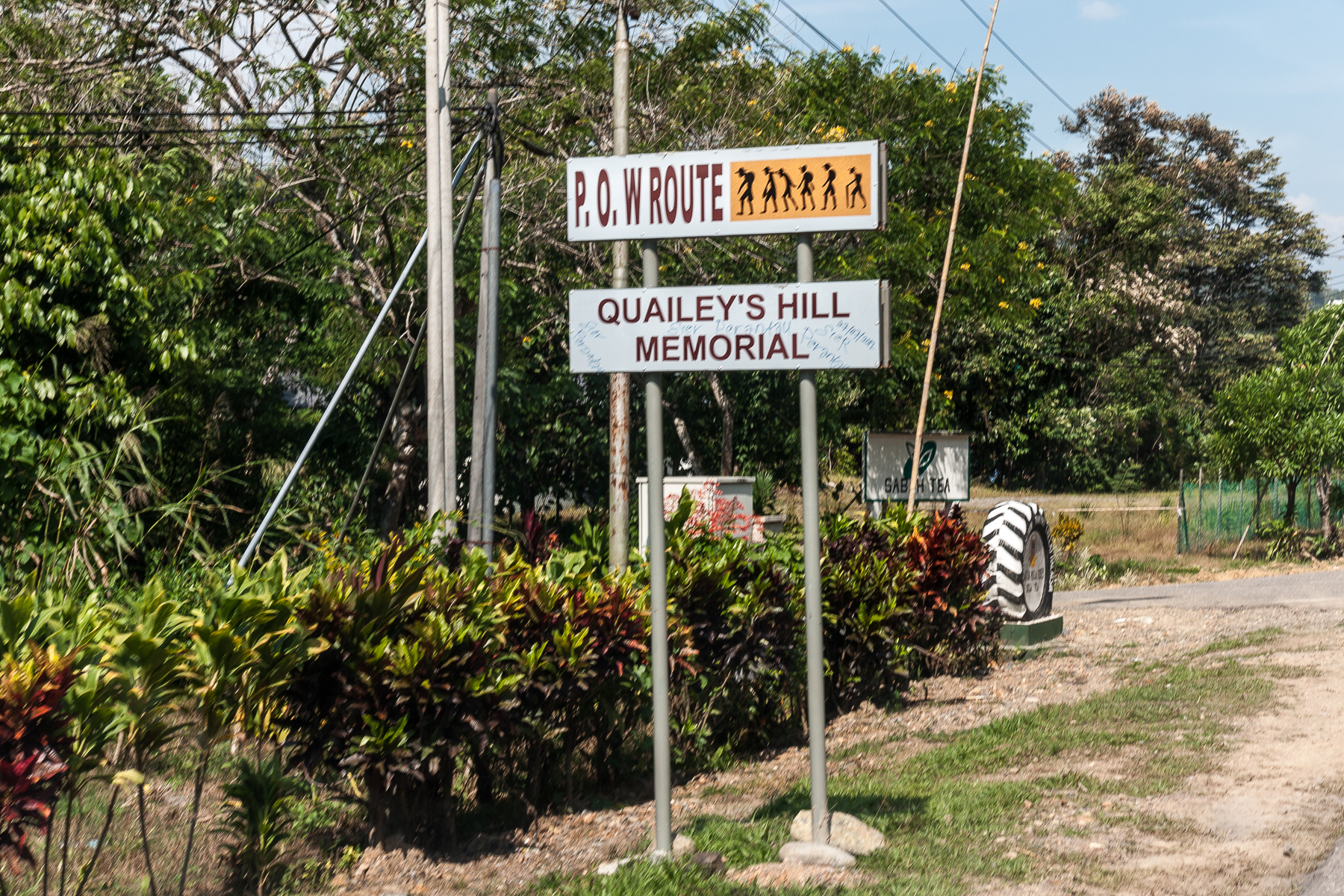
Route sign.

The Quailey's Hill Memorial is one of the station in the "POW Route". The route begins in Sandakan and ends at a camp in Ranau. Every stations on the route is marked with a sign such as on an image in the right.
