= Sandakan camp =

Japanese prisoner-of-war camp during World War II

Coordinates: 5°53′19″N 118°2′50″E

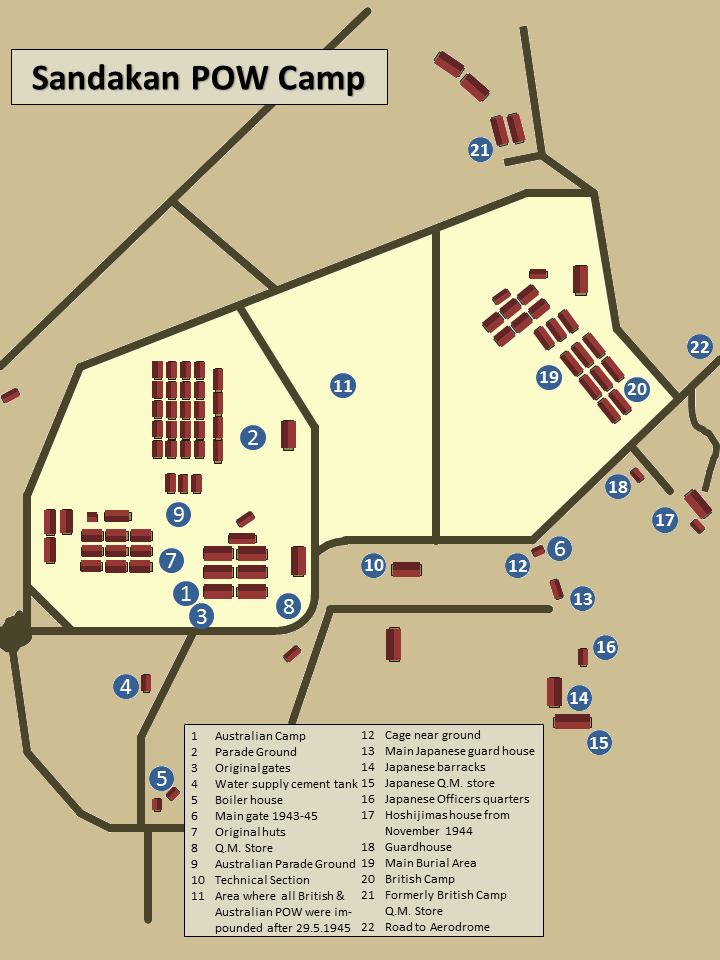
Layout of the POW camp

The Sandakan camp, also known as Sandakan POW Camp (Malay: Kem Tawanan Perang Sandakan), was a prisoner-of-war camp established during World War II by the Japanese in Sandakan in the Malaysian state of Sabah. This site has gained notoriety as the Sandakan Death Marches started from here. Now, part of the former site houses the Sandakan Memorial Park.

== History ==
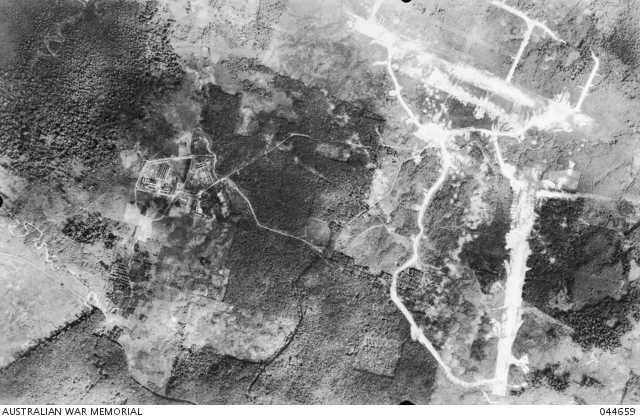
Aerial view of the camp in 1944

After a large-scale military success during the Second World War, Japanese forces had captured large numbers of Allied soldiers as prisoners of war. These prisoners were distributed to various lock-up facilities. In July 1942, the Japanese POW camps in Sandakan received about 1,500 Australians, most of them captured from Singapore and brought here for the purpose of building a military airfield for the Japanese; this date is considered to be the beginning of the camp. In 1943, another 770 British and 500 Australian soldiers were sent to the camp. At the camp's height in 1943, about 2,500 prisoners of war were located in the camp.

In October 1944, when the Japanese increasingly became defensive towards the end of the war, the airfield in Sandakan came under constant heavy bombing by Allied forces. By January 1945, the damage was so great, and the Japanese no longer able to repair the runway, that on 10 January 1945 work on the airstrip was completely stopped. Also in the same month, a group of about 455 prisoners were sent on forced marches by the Japanese.

In May 1945, the Japanese finally decided to close the POW camp. Takakuwa Takuo took over command of the camp on 17 May. On 29 May, he ordered the 536 prisoners to march to Ranau and then set the camp area on fire. Almost all records about the site were destroyed by fire. Other prisoners were marched into the jungle where they perished or were shot by the Japanese guards.

On 10 June 1945 – 30 prisoners had died in the meantime – a final group march of 75 prisoners towards Ranau was set in motion. The remaining prisoners who were stranded on the burned area either died of malnutrition and disease, or were killed by the Japanese guards. By 15 August 1945, none of them remained alive.

Six men returned to Australia from Sandakan as written in Russell Morris' song "Sandakan". One of those men was his father. The other was Billy Young who has published a book about his time in Sandakan.

A rescue operation to free the prisoners, Operation Kingfisher, never came to fruition.

== Information about the camp ==
=== Location ===
The camp was about 1.5 kilometres (1 mile) southwest of the present-day Sandakan Airport.

=== Background ===
According to records, the site was once an experimental farm for the North Borneo Chartered Company, where fruit, grain and cattle were kept.

When the Japanese occupied Borneo, the site then was divided into three main areas; each one bearing part of the Australian and British prisoners of war (Australian compound and the British compound) as well as a site for the Japanese guards and for the residential buildings of the Japanese.

The camp produced its own electricity with a steam boiler, coupled to an alternator. The power house originally was part of the agricultural research station. The wood-fired steam boiler powered the alternator, which produced a 110-Volt current to illuminate the camp and its fencing. The power house also played an important role for the operation of the clandestine transmitter of the camp underground organisation. From 1942 up until its discovery in July 1943, the voltage was raised secretly in the evening hours to provide sufficient power for the transmission equipment.

"The Great Tree" (The Big Tree) – a huge specimen of a Mengarisbaumes (Koompassia excelsa) – was the dominant structure of the POW camp.

Not far away from the Australian part of the camp was a provisions depot and a kitchen for the Japanese, operated by the Japanese quartermaster. Still today, a baseplate as well as a concrete water reservoir of this facility is left.

=== Leader ===
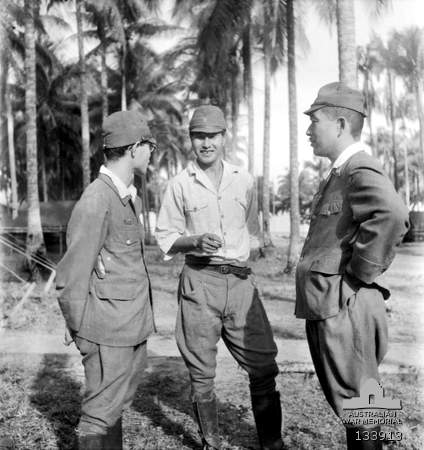
Captain Susumi Hoshijima (centre) during the war crimes trial in Labuan

During the Japanese occupation, the leader who was responsible for the managing of the camp was Susumi Hoshijima, who held the rank of lieutenant. As a military engineer, he was entrusted with the task of establishing a military airfield. Towards the end of the war he was promoted to captain. Athletically built, and 1.8 metres (5 ft 11 in) tall, he was an impressive appearance. He revealed his despotic, unscrupulous character to the newly arrived POWs in April 1943 with the words:

"You will work until your bones rot under the tropical sun of Borneo. You will work for the Emperor. If any of you escape, I will pick out three or four and shoot them. The war will last for 100 years".

In May 1945, the Japanese military leadership gave the order to abandon the POW camp. On 17 May, Captain Takakuwa Takuo and Hoshijima together commanded the prisoners of war.

Both Hoshijima and Takakuwa would later be brought to the Labuan War Crimes Trials, where they were found guilty and sentenced to death by hanging on 6 April 1946 in Rabaul, Papua New Guinea.

== Ill-treatment towards prisoners of war ==
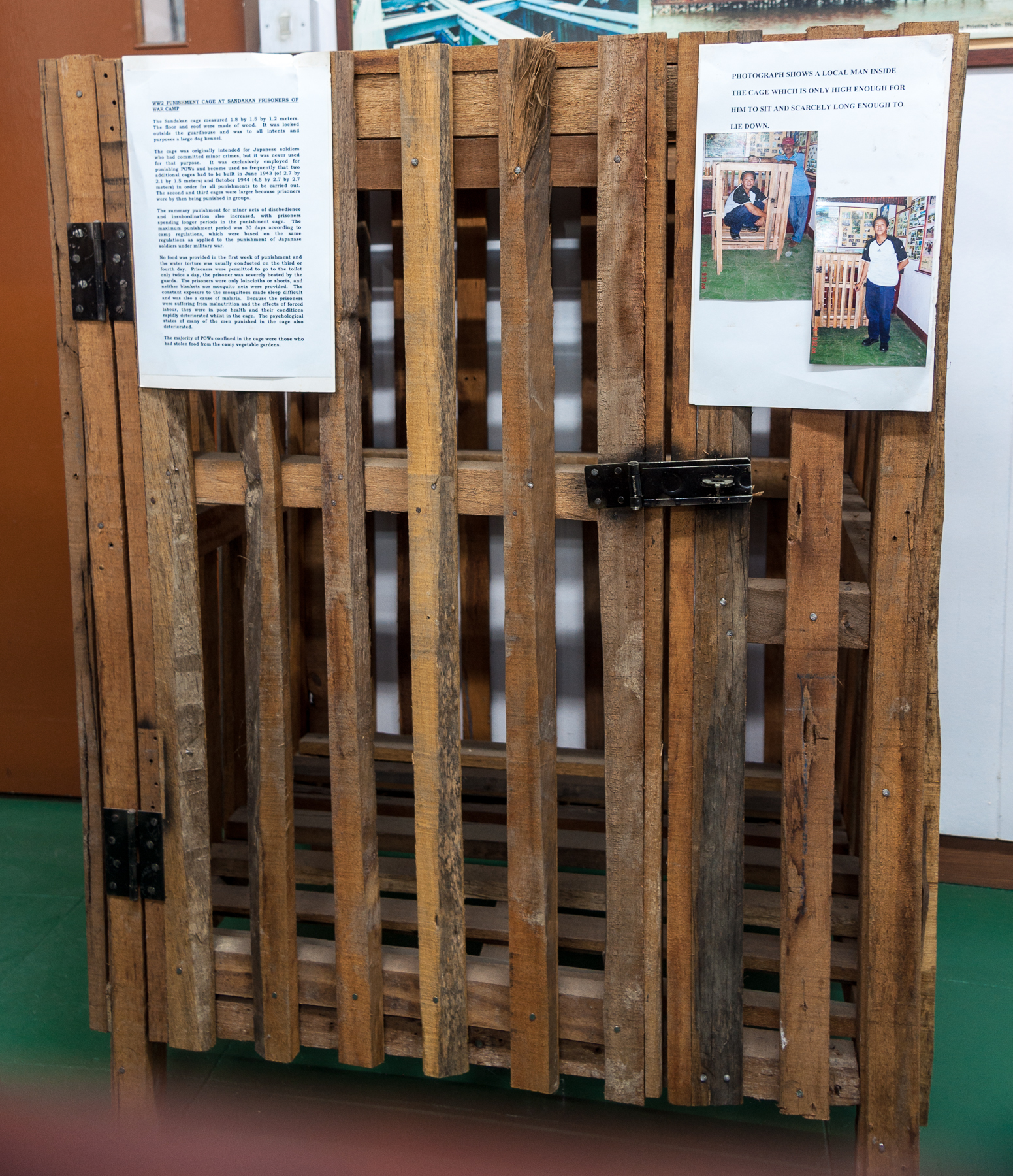
A model of the cage today

The camp was secured by barbed wire to prevent the POWs from escaping. In front of the guards' office, there was a large wooden cage about the size of 1.8 × 1.5 × 1.2 metres, which is quite similar to a dog cage. Originally, cage for punishing minor offences by the Japanese soldiers was already provided; but it was never used for this purpose.

In June 1943 and October 1944, new cages were built, each are larger than the previous one. The second cage was about 2.7 × 2.1 × 1.5 metres, while the third cage was 4.5 × 2.7 × 2.7 metres. The majority of the prisoners who were placed in the cage were caught stealing food from the camp kitchen.

The camp rules for the punishment were based on the same rules that were provided to the Japanese soldiers in other occupied places. The maximum duration of confinement in the cage was limited to 30 days. The use of a toilet was allowed only twice a day. Ill-treatment by shock and water torture were also frequent, and the victim was left in the cage with no food, wearing only a loincloth or shorts. The prisoners were also defenceless against the mosquitoes, their constant attacks on the victims weakened the body, also make sleeping at night almost impossible.

== The camp after the war ==
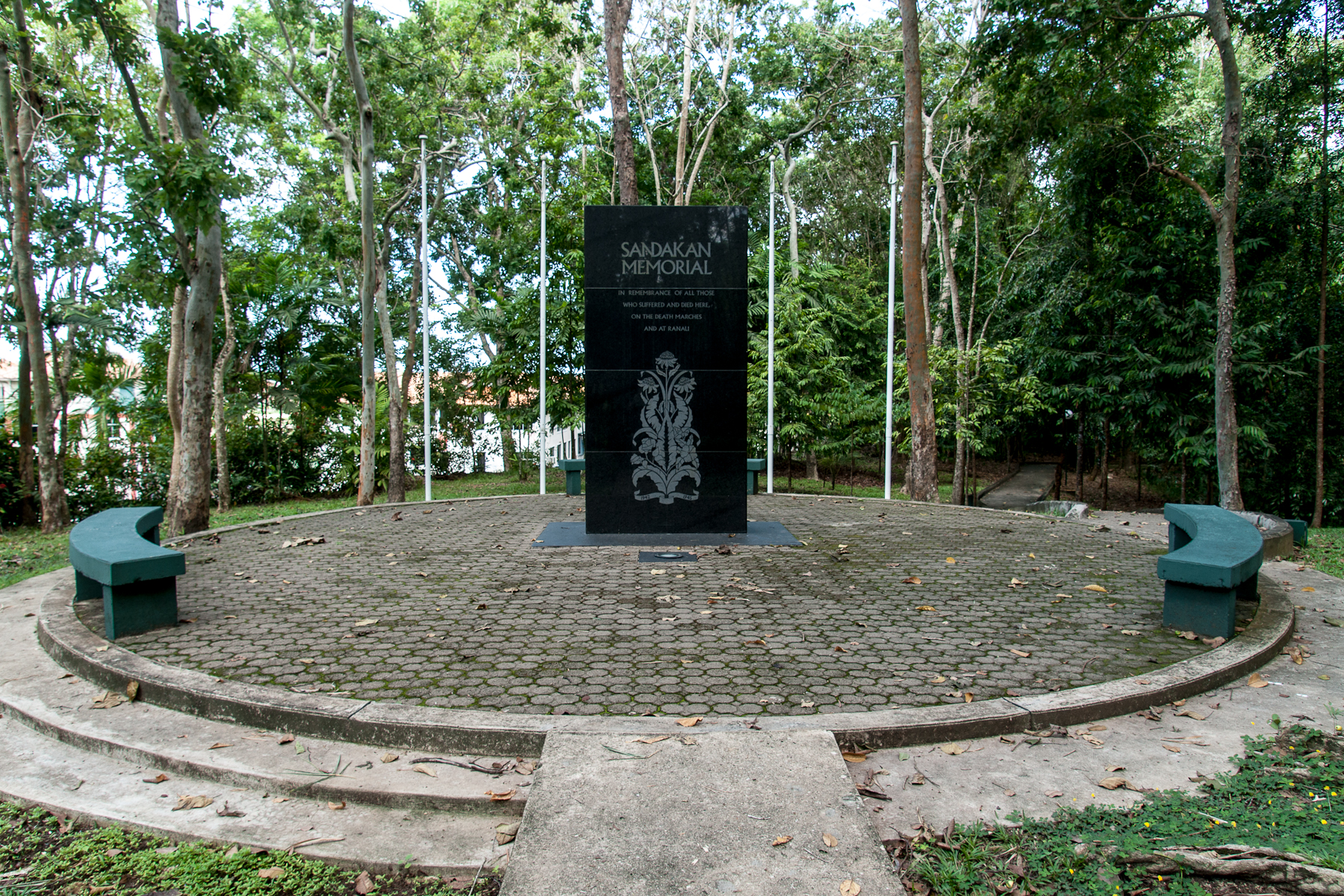
The Sandakan Memorial Park has been built on the site of the former POW Camp

All remains of the prisoners of war that were found during the investigations after the war were transferred to a military cemetery in Labuan. The identified victims were interred there and their graves marked with their name, while the names of the others were listed on the corresponding plaques in Labuan and Singapore.

In 1986, a memorial stone was erected on the site, to pay tribute to Captain Lionel Matthews and other resistance movement people in Sandakan as well as the six survivors of the death marches. In 1995, after finalisation of an agreement between the Government of the State of Sabah, Government of Australia, the veterans association of the Returned and Services League of Australia and the City Council of Sandakan, a memorial was built at the POW camp site, which is known as Sandakan Memorial Park. The unveiling of the memorial took place on 18 March 1999.

== See also ==
- List of Japanese-run internment camps during World War II
- Kundasang War Memorial
