= Sandakan Memorial Park =

- Taman Peringatan Sandakan
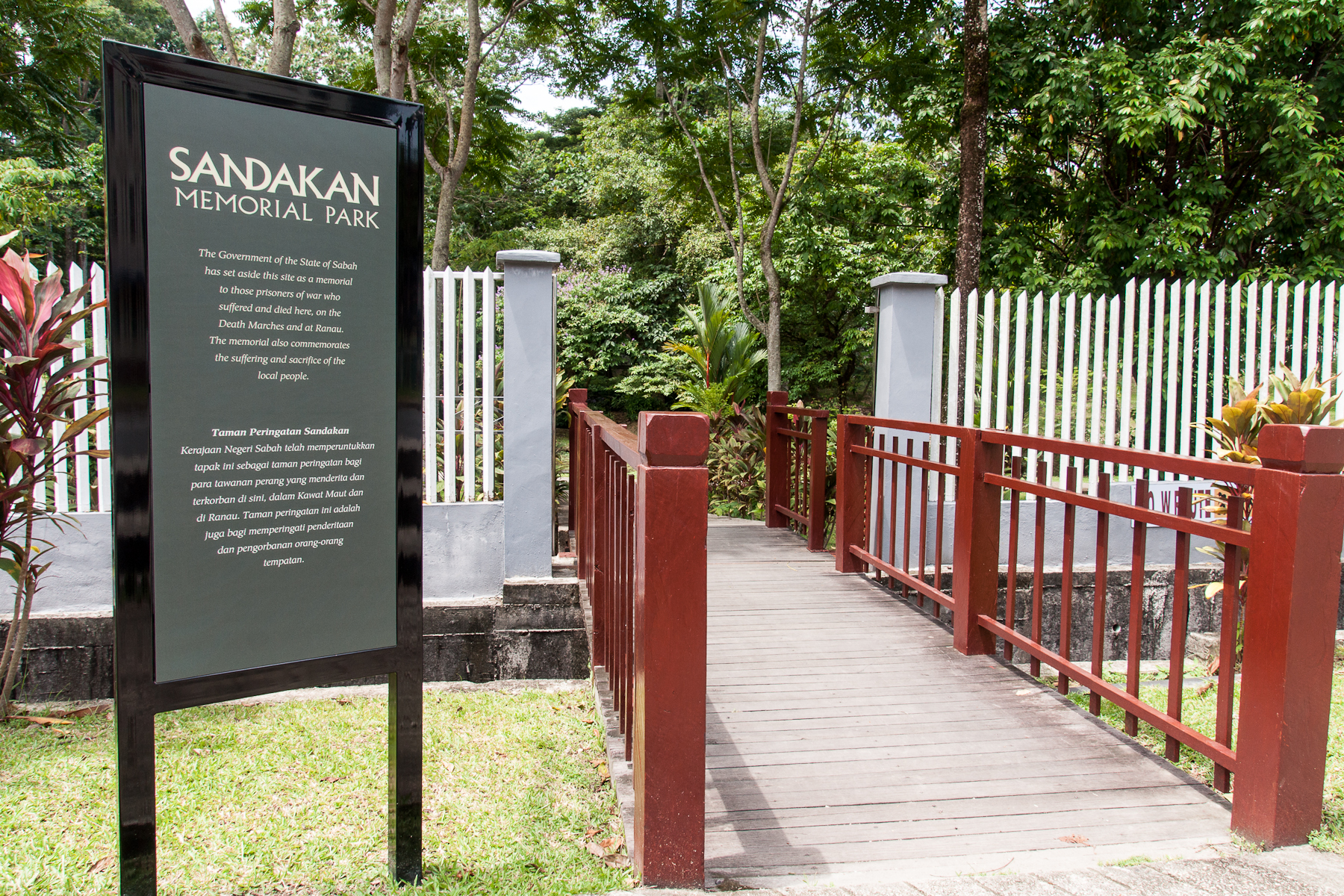
- Entrance to the park.
- Interactive map of Sandakan Memorial Park
- Location: Sandakan
- Coordinates: 5°53′19″N 118°2′50″E
- Type: Stele
- Dedicated to: Commemorates to all prisoner of war who lost their lives during the Sandakan Death Marches

The Sandakan Memorial Park (Malay: Taman Peringatan Sandakan) is a memorial site built in the former grounds of the former Sandakan camp in the Malaysian state of Sabah. The site is dedicated as a memory for all prisoners in the camp who died during the Sandakan Death Marches, and to those died during a march to Ranau. It is also recognises the suffering and sacrifice of the native population. This park hosts the Sandakan Memorial Day service on August 15.

== History ==
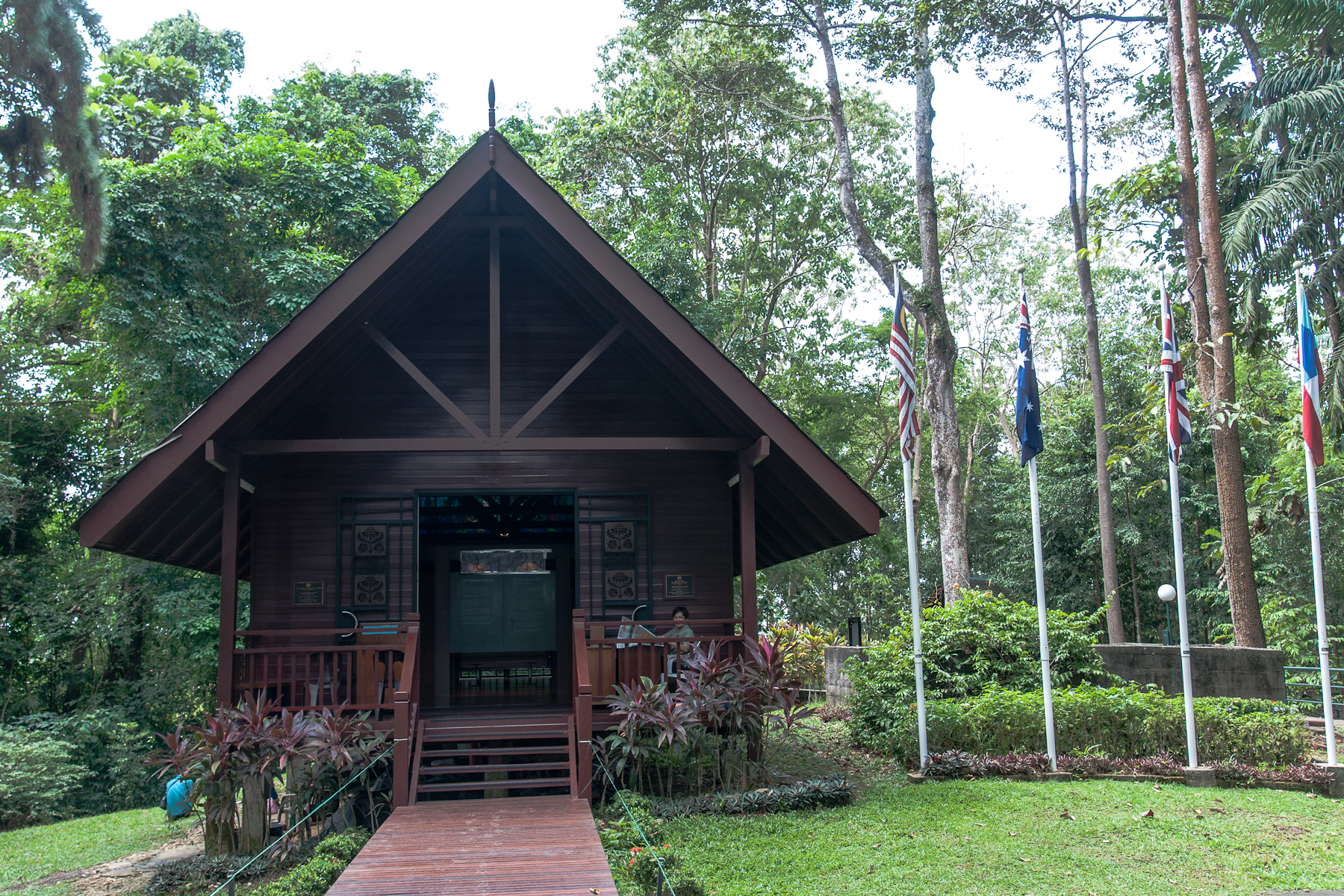
The pavilion with its permanent exhibition.

As the Japanese expanded its Empire into the Southwest Pacific Ocean during the early stage of World War II, a large numbers of Allied soldiers prisoners were detained in a various camp in the pacific. In July 1942, already 1,500 Australian prisoners of war were transferred from Singapore to Sandakan as a forced labour to build a military airfield. The number getting increase in 1943, with about 2,500 prisoners had been housed in the camp site.

At the end of the war, all of the human remains of the prisoners of war, who were found during investigation at the site, were transferred to a military cemetery in Labuan. Those who can be identified were buried in a grave and marked with a name, while those who cannot be identified were listed on a corresponding plaques in Labuan and also in Singapore.

In 1995, an agreement between the state government of Sabah, the government of Australia, the veterans association Returned & Services League of Australia (RSL) and the Sandakan Municipal Council resulted in the creation of this memorial site. The Australian government built the pavilion with an obelisk was erected on the memory site and restored the remains of the technical equipment of the facility with a digger, steam generator and other generator. The opening ceremony of the memorial site was held on 18 March 1999.

== Location ==
The memorial park is located about 1.5 kilometres southwest of present-day Sandakan Airport, which occupies part of the former camp of the Australian B Force.

== Stations ==
The memorial is divided into six stations that are connected by a circular route.

=== Excavator ===
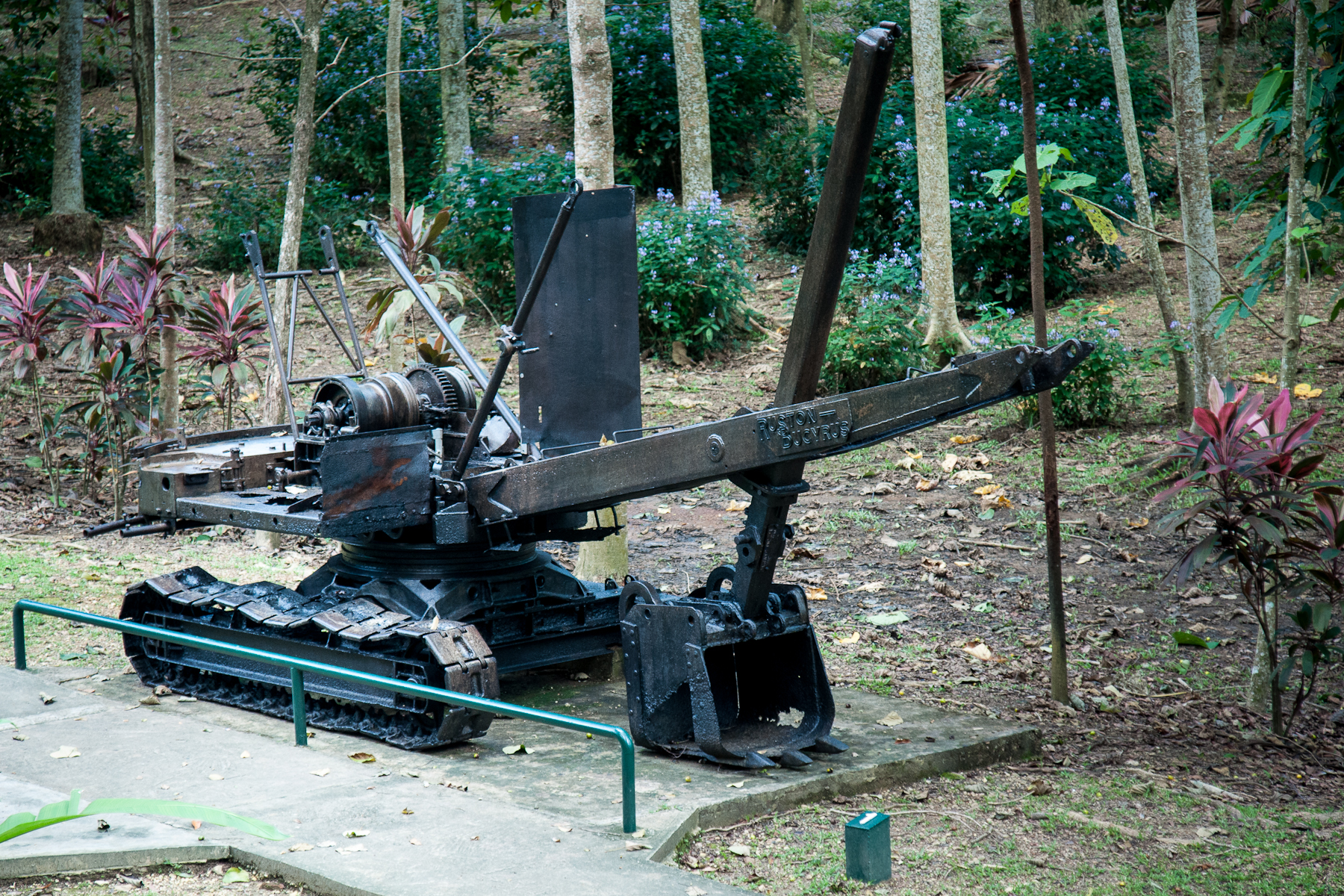
The English built Ruston-Bucyrus excavator.

The excavator was used for the construction of an airport for the Japanese. During repairs, it was sabotaged by Australian prisoners of war rendering it inoperable and so it never worked again.

=== Steam generator and generator ===
The steam generator and other generator became the main power source for the camp. The wood-fired steam engine powered generator, was used for the lighting of the camp and its enclosure.

=== The Great Tree ===
"The Great Tree" (The Big Tree) is a huge specimen of a Mengarisbaumes (Koompassia excelsa) originally stood where the memorial obelisk is placed today. It was the dominant structure of the POW camp by its size. Shortly after the war, the tree was destroyed by a fire. A new Mengarisbaum was planted near the entrance on 25 April 2008 for the park.

=== Food depot, storage area and kitchen ===
The Japanese also operating a food depot and kitchen for the Japanese with water tank has been preserved from concrete.

=== Main entrance and access road ===
The main entrance was on the east side of the memorial park before the storage area. The road leading to the airport and to the left and right was the Mile 8 Road street from Sandakan to Ranau. It was from here, all three marches to Ranau.

== Memorial pavilion ==
The Sandakan Commemorative Pavilion was opened on 18 March 1999 by the Veterans Affairs Minister Bruce Scott of Australia. It contains a permanent exhibition about the POW camp and the death marches in both English and Malay language.

== Obelisk description ==
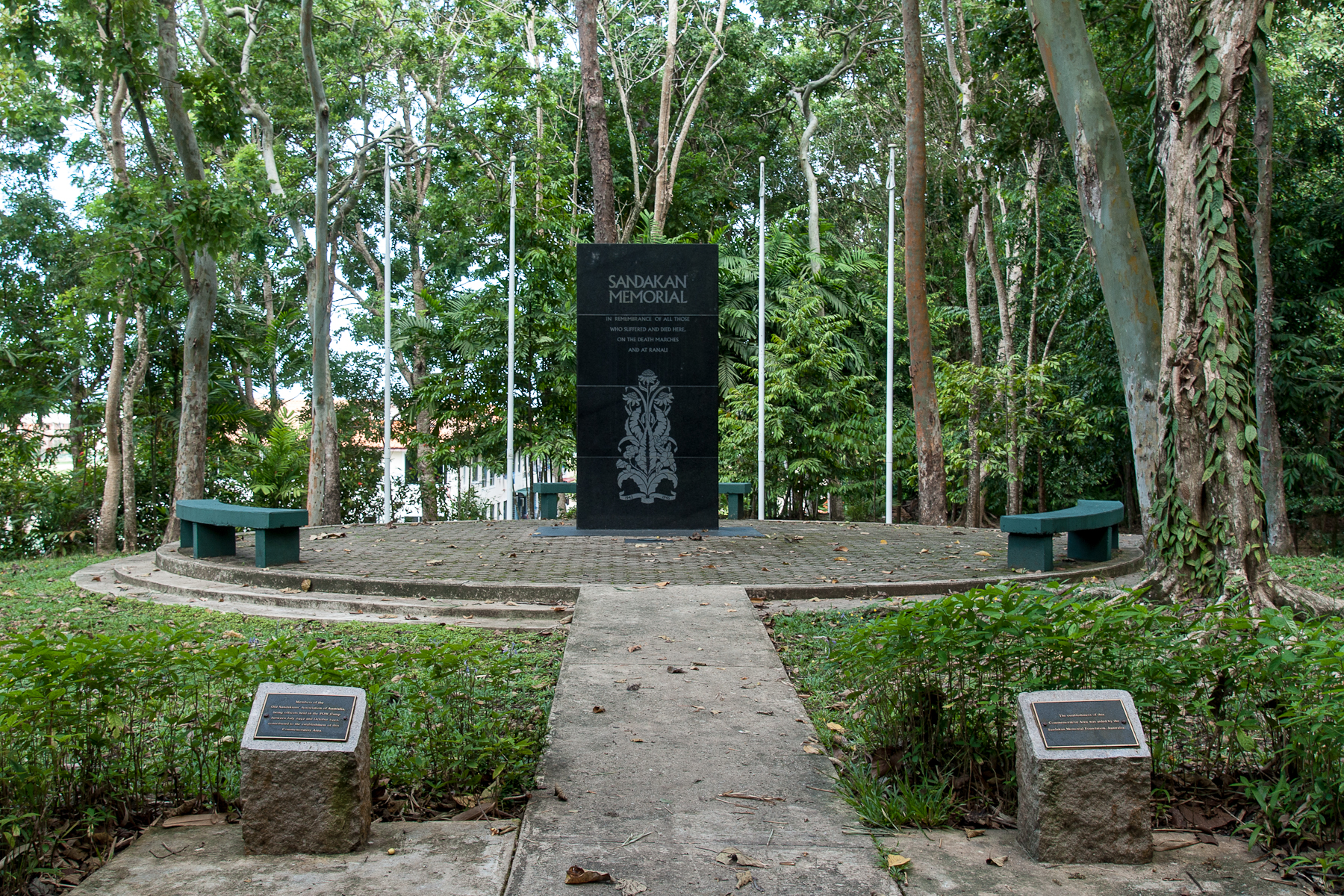
The memorial obelisk.

The "Sandakan Memorial" obelisk is a black stele, on a circular, cobbled square diameter of about ten metres. It bears the inscription:

Sandakan Memorial
In Remembrance Of All Those
Who Suffered and Died Here,
On The Death Marches
And At Ranau

== POW route ==
The memorial park is the first stop on the "POW Route" during the three death marches. The route begins in Sandakan and ends at the "Last POW Camp" at Ranau. Every station on the route is marked with a sign.

== Literature ==
- Australian Government, Office of Australian War Graves SANDAKAN MEMORIAL PARK, Department of Veterans' Affairs, Canberra, 2006
