= Last POW Camp Memorial =

Monument in Ranau, Malaysia

- Tugu Peringatan Kem Tawanan Perang Terakhir
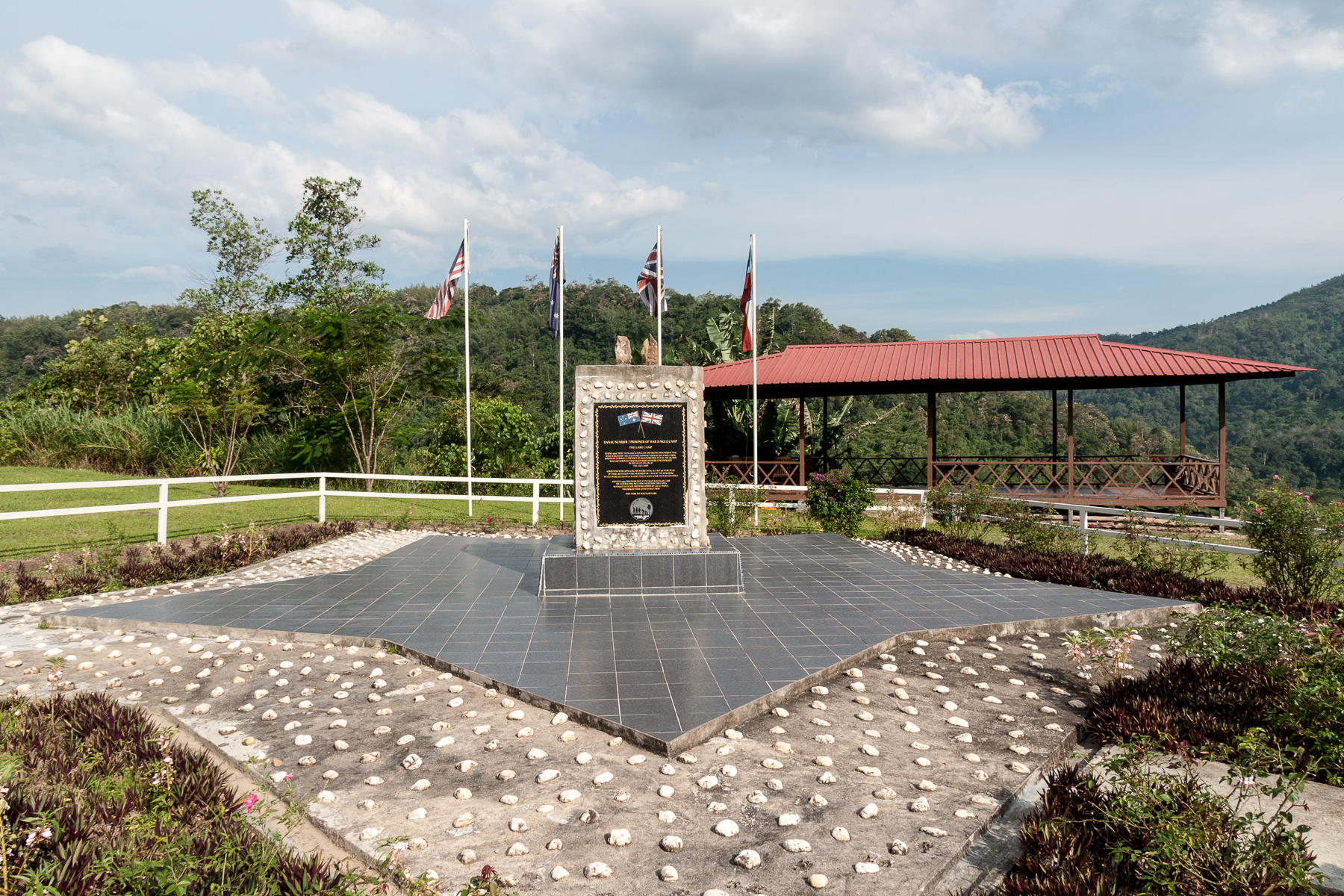
- The memorial.
- Interactive map of Last POW Camp Memorial
- Location: Ranau
- Coordinates: 5°54′28″N 116°38′53″E
- Type: Stele
- Dedicated to: Commemorates the victims of the Sandakan Death Marches who died in the camp of Ranau

The Last POW Camp Memorial (Malay: Tugu Peringatan Kem Tawanan Perang Terakhir) is a memorial in the district of Ranau in the Malaysian state of Sabah, which commemorates the victims of the Sandakan Death Marches who died during their march to Ranau. Of 1,047 British and Australian POWs, only 189 reach this site which is located near Liwagu Valley. Of these 189 total, 153 prisoners died in the next six weeks, 32 were murdered, while only four managed to escape. The current memorial was built where the former camp was located.

== History ==
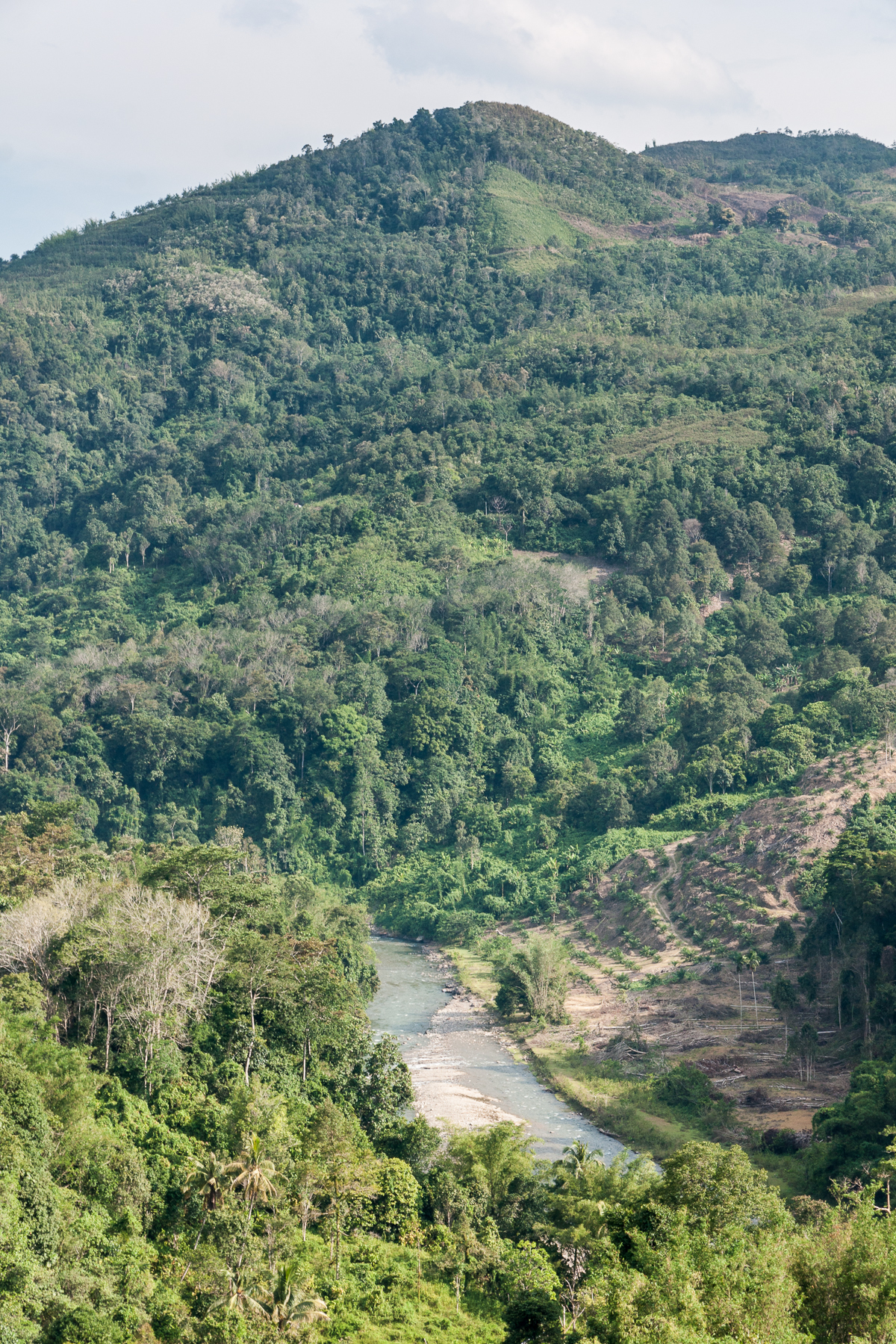
The Liwagu River below the camp site.

The discovery of the camp location goes back to the Australian historian Lynette Silver. The land where the site is located is private property owned by Dr. Othman Minudin who stated that the land should "forever" remain as a memorial. The order also includes that the actual camp site will remain untouched by nature. The memorial stone was erected on 27 August 2009, handed over by the Minister of Tourism Datuk Masidi Manjun, by the landowner Dr. Othman and Lynette Silver as a representative of the members of the public.

== Description ==
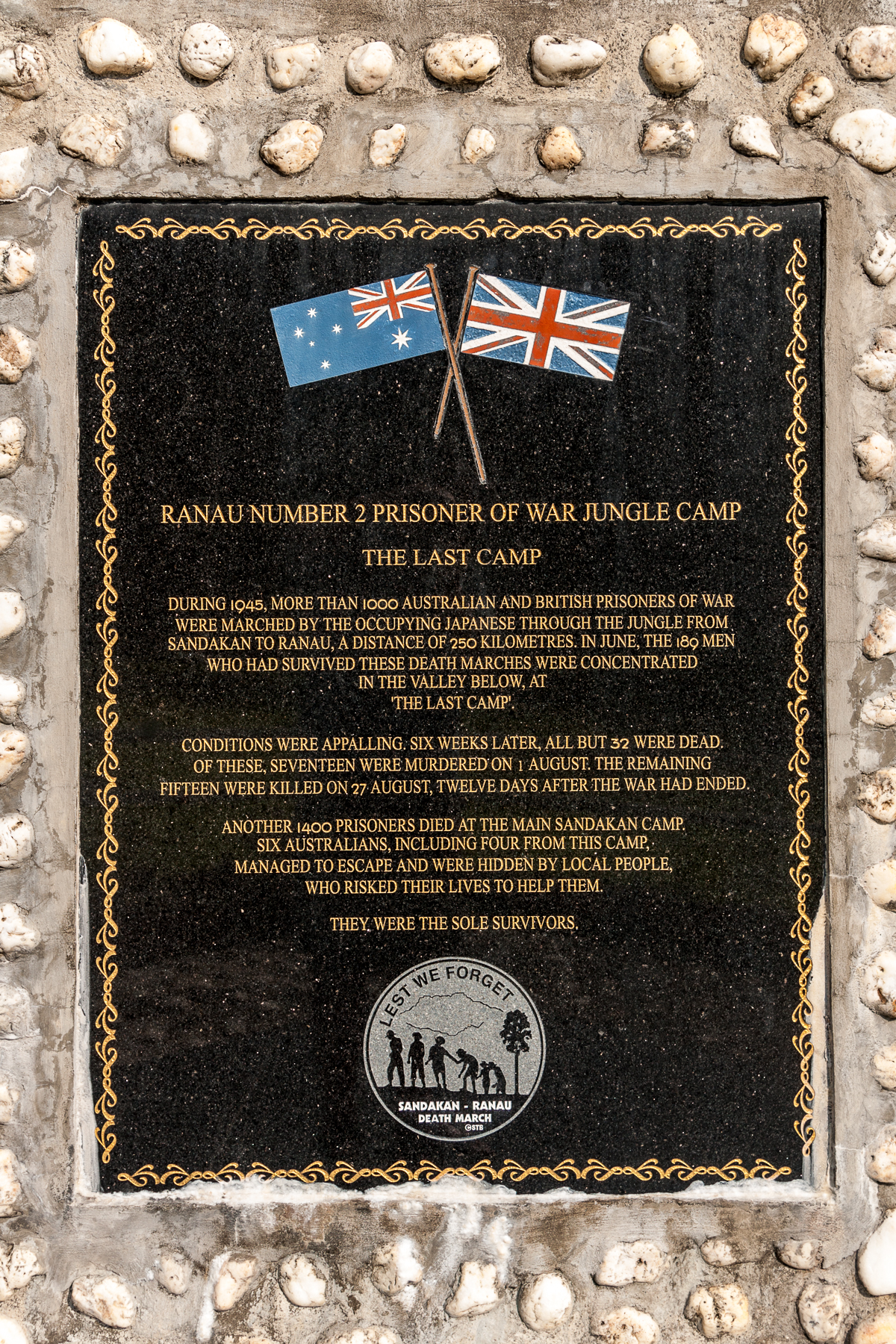
Inscription of the memorial stone in English.

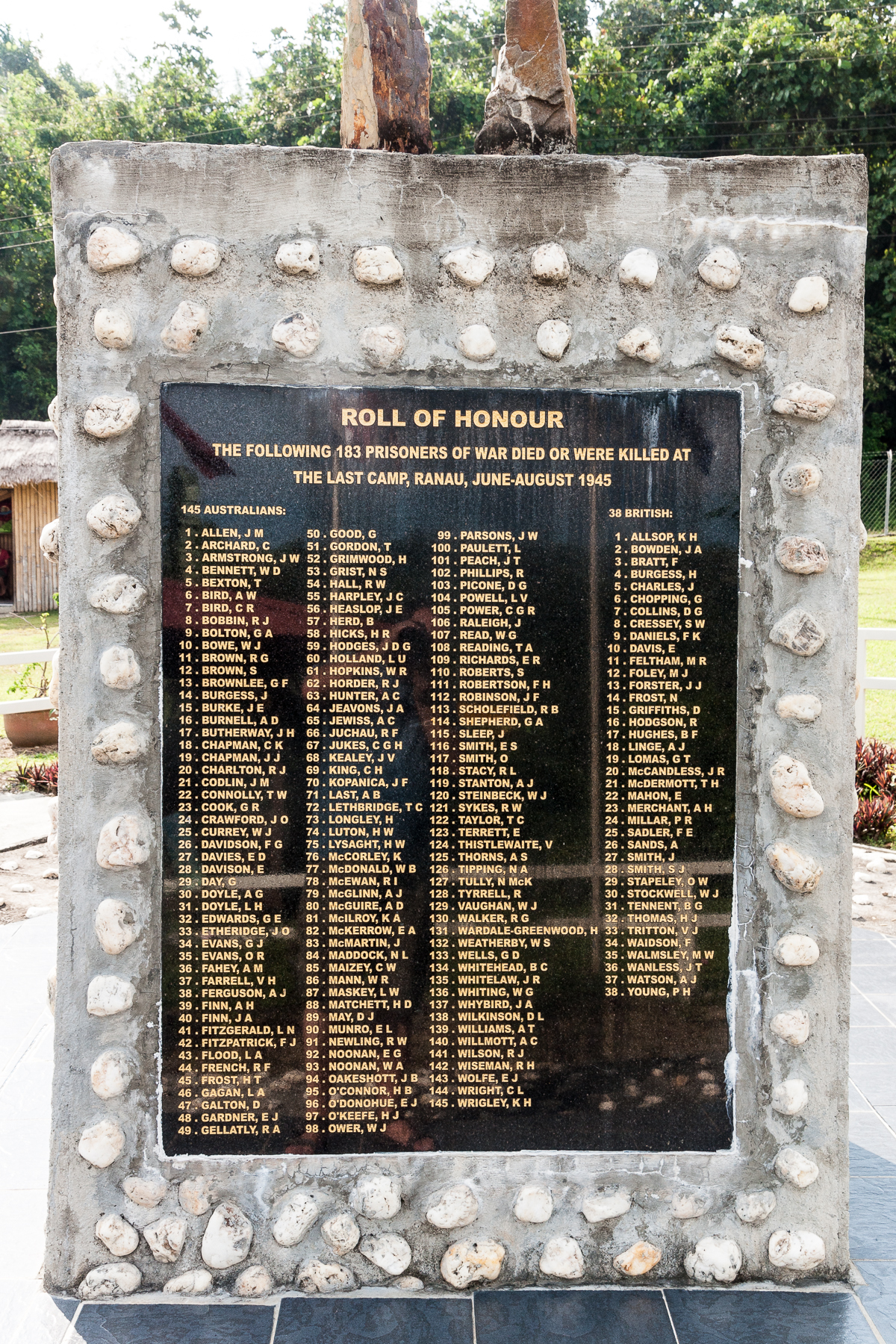
Name of the 183 prisoners who were killed at the last camp.

The memorial is located about 8 kilometres south of Ranau on the road to Tambunan above the Liwagu Valley. The memorial is fenced, but is open from 9 a.m. to 5 p.m. to the public. On a large concrete surface in the shape of a star is a stele of concrete. On the surface of the concrete, 1,047 boulders, originating from the Liwagu River (the river flows below the memorial site), have been inserted. These stones on the concrete surface symbolise each prisoner of war.

The stele is also made of concrete. Another 183 river stones are set into the concrete of the stele; one for each prisoner of war who died in this camp on Liwagu River. On the memorial stone there are four furrowed stone slabs. These stand for the four prisoners of war, who managed to escape during the death march. On each of the four sides of the stele is a stone slab of embedded polished granite. Three panels concerning the history of the death marches are shown in English, Chinese and Malay. On the fourth granite slab, the names of 183 prisoners of war are memorialised.

The memorial stone in English bears the following inscription:

RANAU NUMBER 2 PRISONER OF WAR JUNGLE CAMP
THE LAST CAMP
During 1945, More Than 1000 Australian And British Prisoner Of War
Were Marched By The Occupying Japanese Through The Jungle From
Sandakan To Ranau, A Distance Of 250 Kilometres. In June, The 189 Men
Who Had Survived these Death Marches Were Concentrated
In The Valley Below, At
'The Last Camp'

Conditions Were Appalling, Six Weeks Later, All But 32 Were Dead.
Of These, Seventeen Were Murdered on 1 August. The Remaining
Fifteen were Killed On 27 August, Twelve Days After The War Had Ended.

Another 1400 Prisoners Died At the Main Sandakan Camp.
Six Australians, Including Four From This Camp,
Managed To Escape And Were Hidden By Local People,
Who Risked Their Lives To Help Them.

They Were The Sole Survivors.

== POW route ==
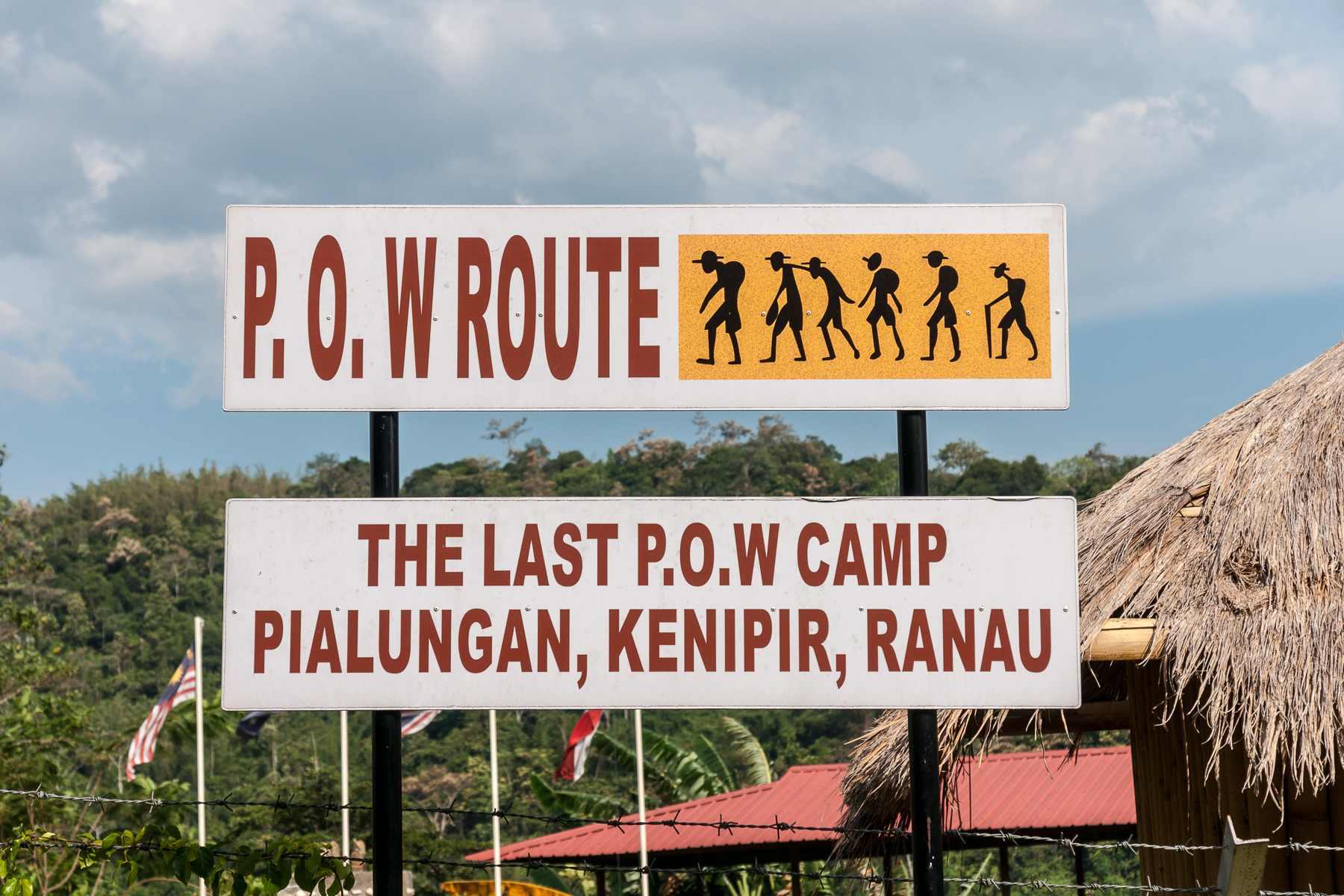
The "POW route" signboard before the memorial.

The "Last POW Camp Memorial" is the final station of the "POW Route" during the three death marches. The route begins in Sandakan and ends at the "Last Camp" of Ranau. Each station on the route is marked with a sign.

== Literature ==
- Lynette Ramsay Silver: Sandakan – A Conspiracy of Silence, 4. Auflage, Sally Milner Publishing Pty., 2011, ISBN 978-1-86351-424-8
