= Toodyay Community Radio =

Radio station in Toodyay, Western Australia

Australia
- Broadcast area: Toodyay RA1 ()
- Frequency: 105.3 MHz FM
- Branding: Jukebox Radio

Programming
- Language: English
- Format: General 50s to Today, Drama Plays, Comedy, Local Interest

Ownership
- Owner: Toodyay Community Radio Inc Assoc.; (Toodyay Community Radio Inc Assoc.)

History
- First air date: 3 December 2010
- Last air date: 25 March 2015
- Former call signs: Jukebox Radio (6TJR)

Technical information
- ERP: 1,000 watts
- HAAT: 270 m

Toodyay Community Radio was a community radio station broadcasting to Toodyay and the surrounding Wheatbelt area of Western Australia from studios in the town of Toodyay, Western Australia under the callsign of Jukebox Radio (6TJR). Its format was general music from the 1950s-onwards, drama plays, comedy series, documentaries and children's interests.

Toodyay Community Radio was established in 2010 under the name Toodyay Community Radio Inc. Assoc. and commenced broadcasting at 9am on Friday, 3 December 2010. It was a volunteer run organisation and was listener funded.

== Programming ==
Toodyay Community Radio had a comprehensive schedule and played a mix of Rock and Roll, 50s, 60s, 70s, 80s music, Disco and Club Classic music as well as many Drama plays, comedy series and documentaries. Part of its commitment to the community was supporting local music and the arts.

== Jukebox Radio ==
Being a community radio station, and therefore relying on volunteers, Toodyay didn't want to be prone to the same problems facing other community radio stations, where the availability of its volunteers and presenters could be unpredictable. Toodyay Community Radio turned itself over to its listeners during the day, and overnight, by allowing them to access part of the station's music library through the station's website, and to request the music that they wanted to hear. This service differed greatly from request services offered by other radio stations, in that other stations allow listeners to email the station, and a request gets assigned to the next appropriate program. Toodyay's Jukebox Radio allowed the listener's request to enter into a queue to be played in order, just like a jukebox.

== Ties with Toodyay District High School ==
Toodyay Community Radio was involved in many projects with the local community, but had close ties with Toodyay District High School. In 2011, the Year 9 and 10 Drama students were involved in recording an updated version of the drama play 'Six From Borneo' that was originally broadcast on ABC radio in 1947. The play tells the story of over 2000 prisoners of war, held by the Japanese in Sandakan, North Borneo during World War II. The play, quite dramatically, tells the story of the Sandakan Death Marches that the prisoners were taken on, and how only six POW's survived by escaping. All six to escape were Australian Soldiers. The story is very poignant to Toodyay, as three brothers from the town were killed on these death marches. The play went into production in May 2011 and was recorded by Toodyay Community Radio and was broadcast on Remembrance day 2011. A CD of the play was produced and was presented to members involved with the production. A copy is held at the National Sound Archives of Australia.

== See also ==
- List of radio stations in Australia
- List of Radio Stations in Western Australia
- List of radio station callsigns in Western Australia
