= Toodyay District High School =

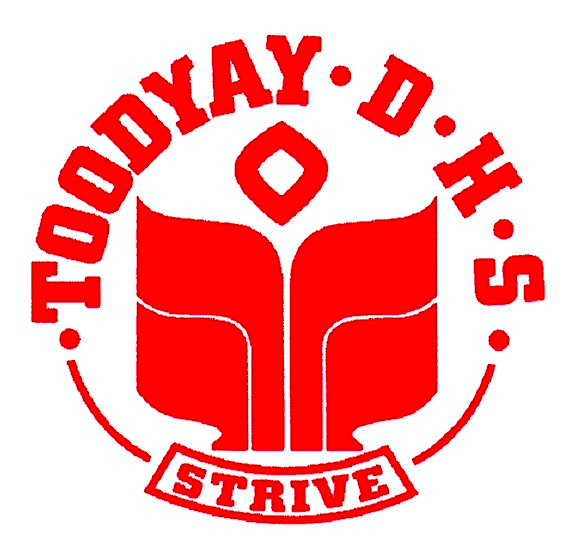

Location
- Toodyay, Wheatbelt region, Western Australia; Australia
- Coordinates: 31°32′53″S 116°28′22″E

Information
- Type: Government combined school
- Motto: Strive
- Established: 1885; 140 years ago
- Principal: David Ball
- Teaching staff: 28 full-time equivalent (2020)
- Years: K–10
- Enrolment: 333 (2020)
- Campus type: Regional
- Colours: Red and white
- Website: toodyaydhs.wa.edu.au

Toodyay District High School is a government combined school, located in Toodyay, a town in the Wheatbelt region of Western Australia, Australia.

Established in 1886, the school currently has 333 students in total (as of 2020), from Year K to Year 10; of whom 25 percent identified as Indigenous Australians and 15 percent of whom were from a language background other than English. The school is operated by the WA Department of Education. The school principal is David Ball.

The school district includes the town of Toodyay and surrounding agricultural areas.

== History ==
The original Toodyay school, known as Newcastle, was built in 1886 and opened in 1887. This building is now the Uniting Church. The school was renamed Toodyay in 1910, and the school moved to its present site on the Avon River in 1954. In 1967, it commenced offering Year 8–10 classes.

A fire in 1993 destroyed most of the existing buildings and a rebuilt school was opened on the same site eighteen months later. The Toodyay District High School Parents and Citizens Association raised a substantial amount of money to re-equip these new buildings.

The closest school for Year 11 and 12 students is Northam Senior High School.

== Community work ==
The school works in strong partnership with its local community. Each year, the school embarks on a project involving students in their community. The restoration of Newcastle Park is the product of projects involving students. Students have also been actively involved in revegetation projects along local waterways. A highlight of 2004 was a year 10 student winning a public speaking competition to earn a place on the Premier's Anzac trip to Gallipoli.

== Extra-curricular activities ==
Many opportunities are provided for students to participate in extra-curricular activities. Students and families have hosted annual visits by Japanese students. Students have also participated in school trips to Japan. Country Week, Camps, Emergency Service Cadets and an annual Ski Trip add to the opportunities available for students at Toodyay District High School.

== Six From Borneo project ==
In early 2011, the Year 9 and 10 Drama students were involved in recording an updated version of the play Six From Borneo, which was originally broadcast on ABC radio in 1947. The play tells the story of over 2000 prisoners of war, held by the Japanese in Sandakan, North Borneo during World War II. The play tells the story of the Sandakan Death Marches that the prisoners were taken on, and how only six POWs, all of whom were Australian, survived by escaping. The story is relevant to Toodyay as four local men, including three brothers, were killed on the death marches. The play commenced recording in May 2011 with the help of the Toodyay community, including local radio station Toodyay Community Radio, Toodyay RSL and the Shire of Toodyay and has been broadcast periodically by Toodyay Community Radio since 2011.

== See also ==
- Education in Western Australia
- List of district high schools in rural Western Australia
