= Kundasang War Memorial =

World War II memorial in Malaysia

- Tugu Peringatan Perang Kundasang
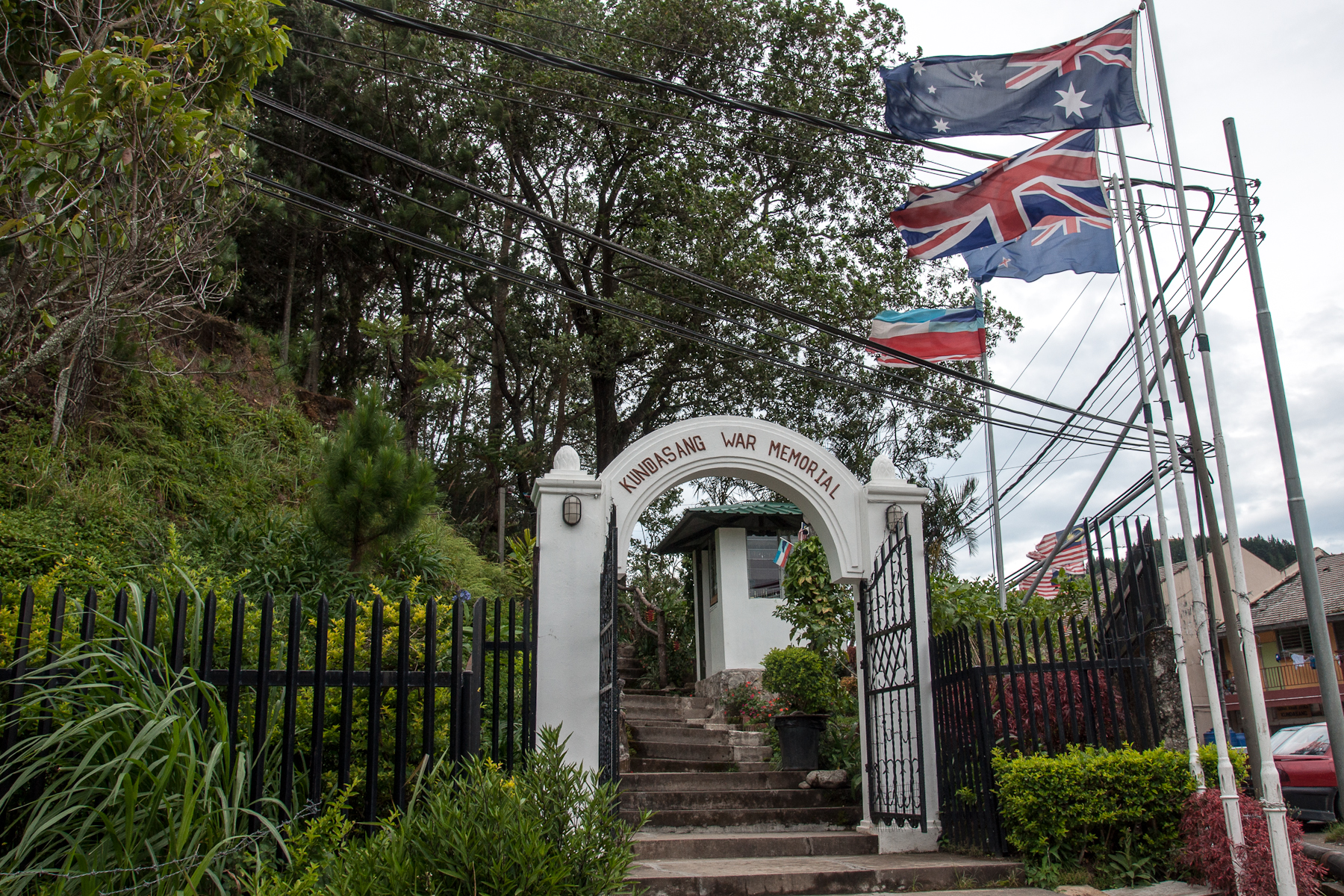
- The entrance gate
- Interactive map of Kundasang War Memorial
- Location: Kundasang
- Coordinates: 5°59′15″N 116°34′37″E
- Designer: JC Robinson
- Opening date: 1962
- Dedicated to: The British and Australian soldiers who died in the Sandakan POW camp. Remembering also the suffering and sacrifice of the native populations of Sabah.

The Kundasang War Memorial (Malay: Tugu Peringatan Perang Kundasang) is a memorial located in Kundasang in the Malaysian state of Sabah, which is dedicated to the British and Australian soldiers who died in the Sandakan POW camp during their forced death marches from Sandakan to Ranau. Besides that, it also recognises the suffering and sacrifice of the native population of Sabah.

== Location ==
The memorial is located in the small town of Kundasang, about 92 km (57 mi) from the state capital of Kota Kinabalu. It is located immediately behind the vegetable wholesale stalls, and situated on a hill.

== Background ==
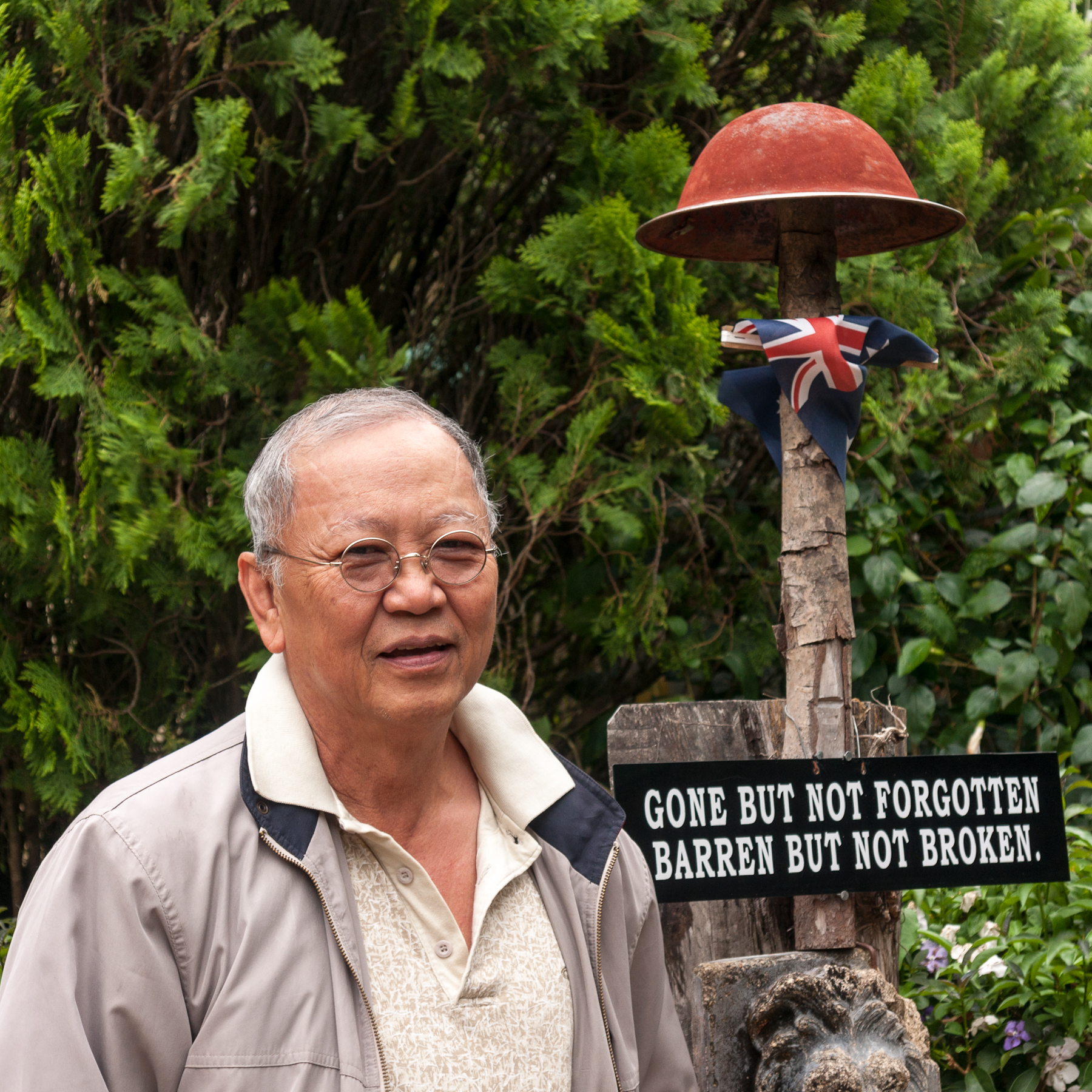
Mr. Sevee Charuruks.

The establishment of the memorial can be traced back to Major Gordon Senior 'Toby' Carter DSO, a New Zealand war veteran and employee of the Shell Oil Co. (Borneo), who gave the ideas for the construction of the memorial in 1962. His idea was for the memorial to commemorate the 2,428 Australian and British prisoners who died during World War II at the Sandakan POW Camp, and the casualties of the three death marches. Of the 2,500 Australian and British prisoners of war, only six Australians survived these death marches.

The construction was later led by Mr. JC Robinson who was a local architect and it opened in 1962. However, due to insufficient revenue for upgrading as the memorial covers a large area, it fell into disrepair even though the Sabah state government injected some funds in 1995.

In 2005, a Thai living in Malaysia, Mr. Sevee Charuruks from Kota Kinabalu, undertook the restoration as a private retirement project. In subsequent years, the Australian government was also involved in several contributions to the further restoration. Such as the contribution of RM120,000 for the fencing of the plot, RM350,000 for the Australian Memorial Hall (which serves the screening of documentaries), RM120,000 in the demolition and reconstruction of the concrete wall in the Contemplation Garden and another RM14,000 for the construction of the Confrontation Memorial.

As a reward for his contribution efforts, Charuruks has been awarded the Member of the Most Excellent Order of the British Empire (MBE) by the British government, while the Australian government conferred on him an honorary award under the Member of the Order of Australia (AM).

== Outline ==
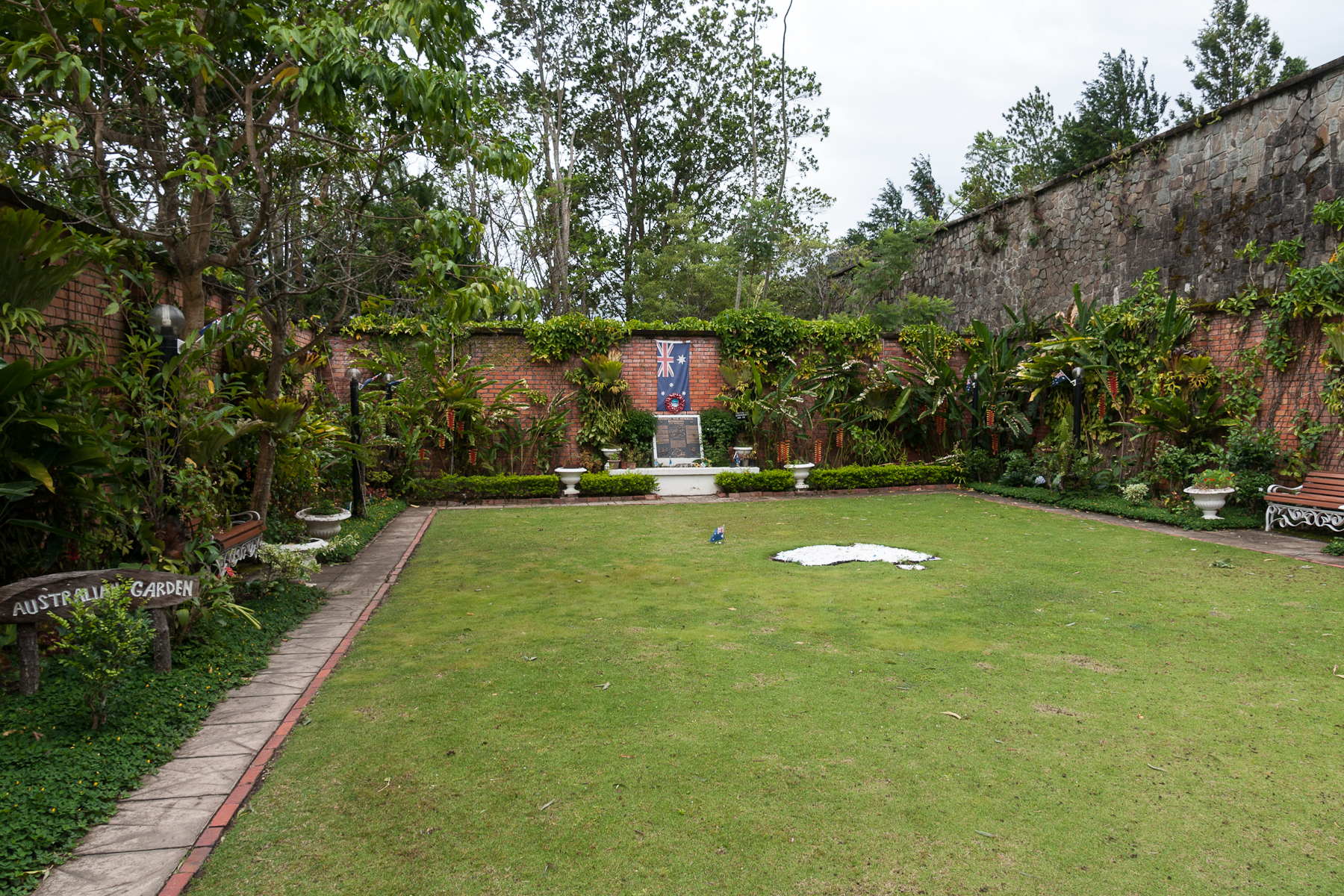
The Australian Garden.

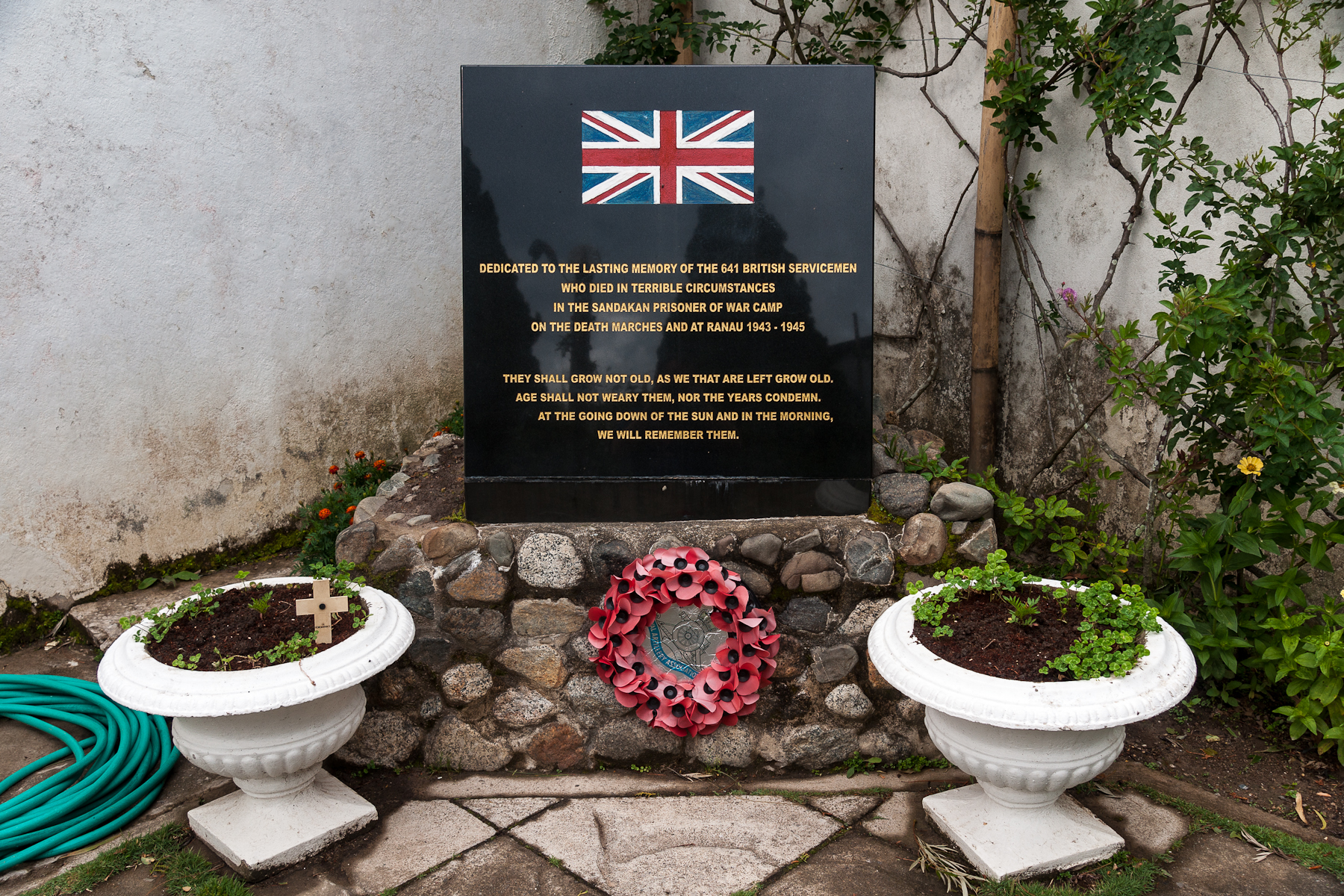
Plaque in English Rose Garden.

The memorial is divided into four interconnecting but separate areas that are connected by a trail, namely:

- The Australian Garden,
- the English Rose Garden,
- the Borneo Garden with wild flowers of Mount Kinabalu and
- the Contemplation Garden.

The first three gardens represent the home countries of the victims.

=== Australian Garden ===
The core of the Australian garden is the Australian flag and a bronze plaque with a heading titled "Kinabalu Kundasang War Memorial and Australia". There is also a panel documented in English and Malay with the title "The history of British and Australian prisoners of war in Sabah" created by artist Ross J. Bastiaan in 1998. Below the relief of Borneo was written in English the creation of the memorial. While in the lower middle part of the plate is a graphical representation of a roadmap during the death marches.

=== English Rose Garden ===
This section, dedicated to the British POWs, is laid as a rose garden. A black marble slab with the flag of the United Kingdom bears this inscription:

Dedicated To The Lasting Memory Of The 641 British Servicemen
Who Died In Terrible Circumstances
In The Sandakan Prisoner Of War Camp
On The Death Marches And At Ranau 1943–1945
They Shall Grow Not Old, As We That Are Left Grow Old
Age Shall Not Weary Them, Nor The Years Condemn
At The Going Down Of The Sun And In The Morning
We Will Remember Them.

=== Borneo Garden ===
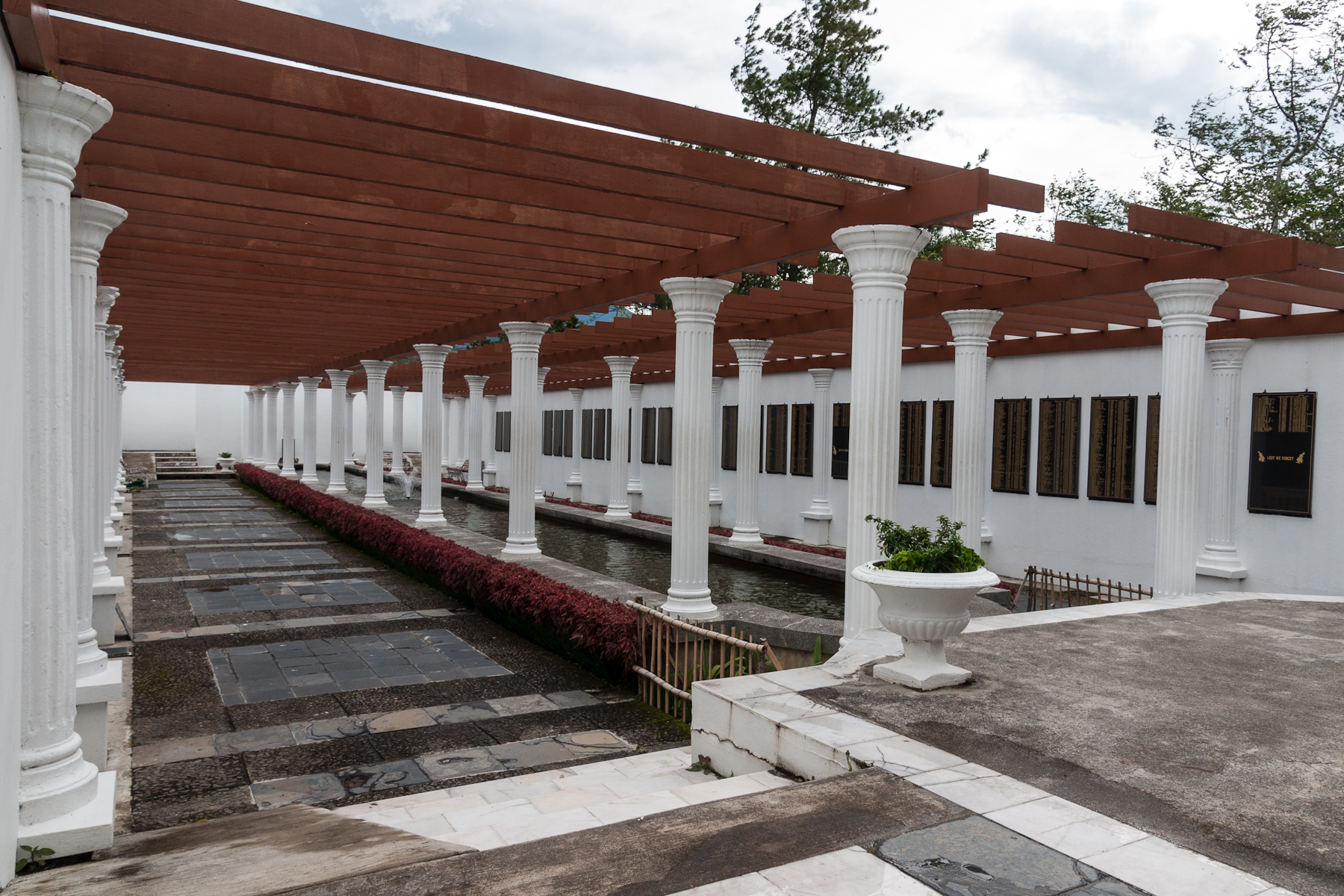
Contemplation Garden.

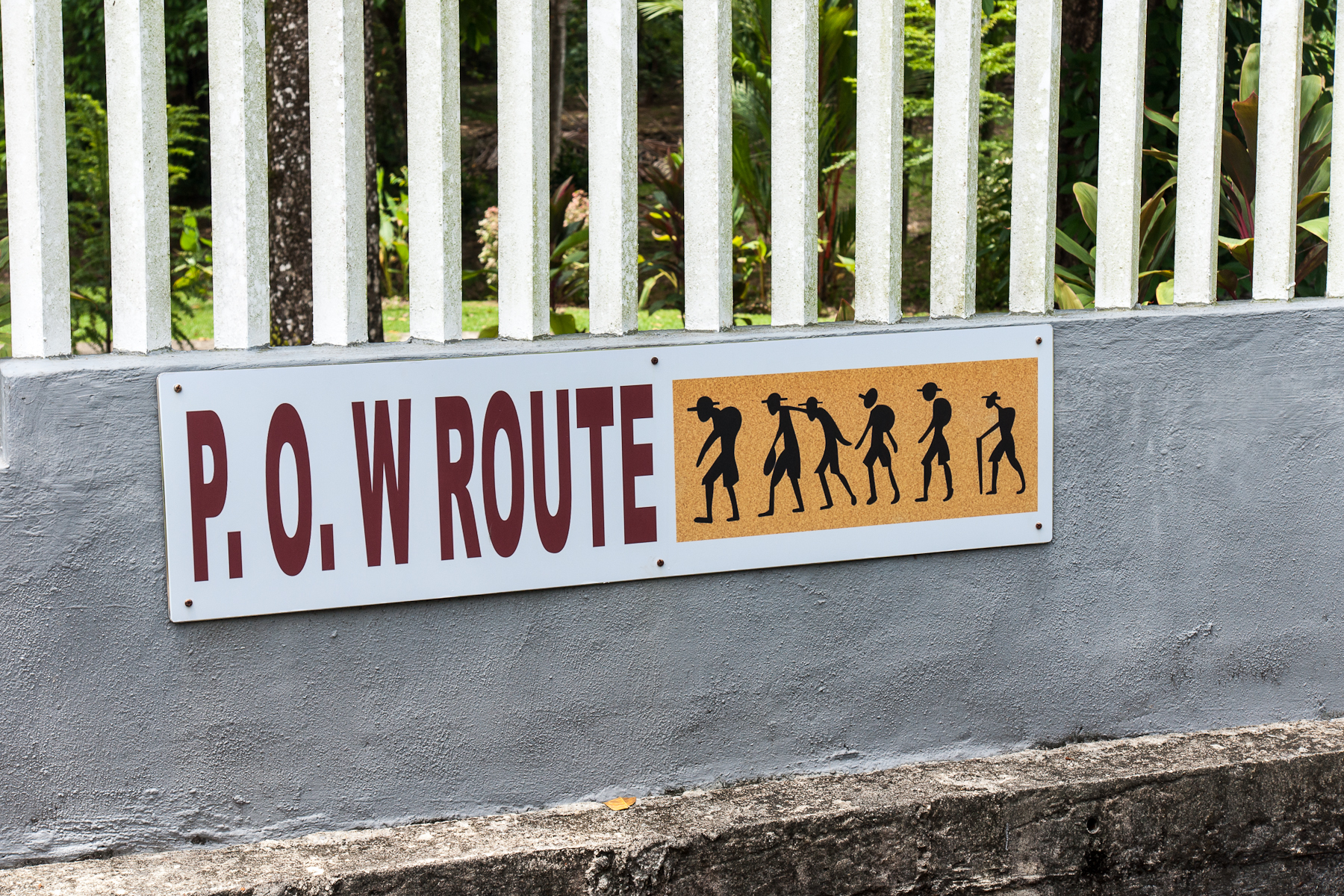
The "P.O.W. Route" mark.

The Borneo Garden is dedicated to the victims who hailed from Borneo, especially the ethnic groups in Sabah who had tried to help the prisoners of war in any way and were themselves killed. In this garden, several plants and flowers are grown that are native to Sabah, especially rare orchid species like the domestic Paphiopedilum rothschildianum (Rothschild's slipper orchid}, from the genus of Paphiopedilum.

=== Contemplation Garden ===
In the Contemplation Garden, a column passing passage leads to a reflection pond and pergola. In 2011, marble panels were installed here with the names of all the victims.

== POW route ==
The last stop in the Kundasang War Memorial is the "POW Route", which marks the stations of the three death marches in the field. It begins in Sandakan and ends at this memorial. The stations of the route are now marked with a sign board.
