= Operation Kingfisher (World War II) =

Operation Kingfisher was an operation planned to rescue Allied prisoners of war from Japanese captivity in Borneo towards the end of the Second World War. The operation did not come to fruition and almost 2,500 POWs died during the Sandakan Death Marches.

== See also ==
- Batu Lintang camp
- Berhala Island, Sandakan
- Borneo campaign, 1945
- 1st Parachute Battalion (Australia)
- The March (1945)
