= Labuan War Cemetery =

Cemetery in East Malaysia

- Commonwealth War Graves Commission
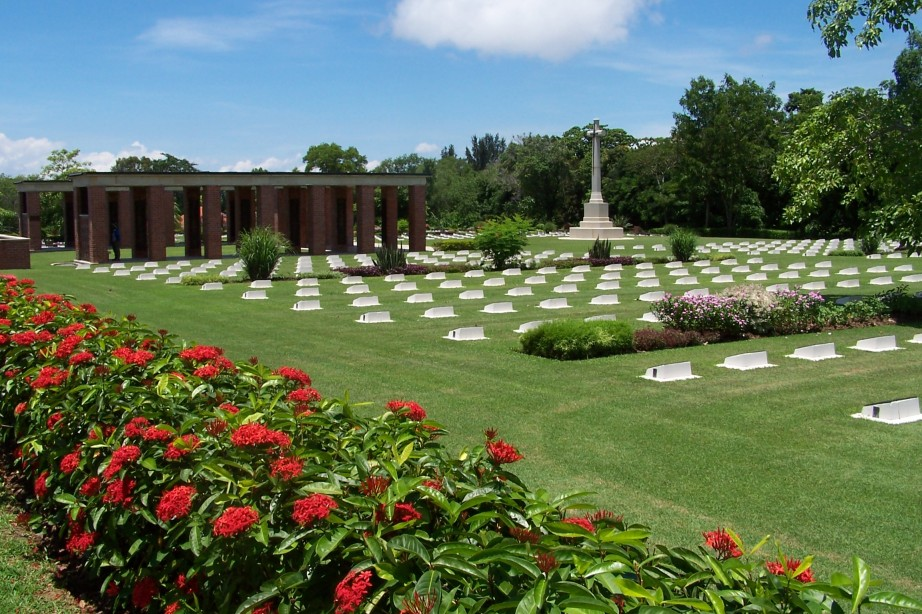
- Used for those deceased 1942–1945
- Established: 28 December 1945
- Location: 5.2870°N 115.2619°E; Labuan, Malaysia
- Total burials: 3,908
- Unknowns: 2,156

Burials by nation
- Specific figures are not available

Burials by war
- World War II: 1,752

Labuan War Cemetery (Malay: Tanah Perkuburan Perang Labuan) is a Commonwealth World War II graveyard in Labuan, Malaysia.

== The cemetery ==
Many of the personnel buried in this cemetery, including Indian and Australian troops, were killed during the Japanese invasion of Borneo or the Borneo campaign of 1945. Others were prisoners of war in the region, including a number of those who perished on the infamous Sandakan Death Marches, and many hundreds of Allied POWs (mostly British and Australian) who died during their imprisonment by the Japanese at Batu Lintang camp near Kuching were also reburied here.

This graveyard was erected by Commonwealth War Graves Commission. Among those buried are Jack Mackey (1922–1945) and Tom Derrick (1914–1945), each of whom received the Victoria Cross.

== Gallery ==
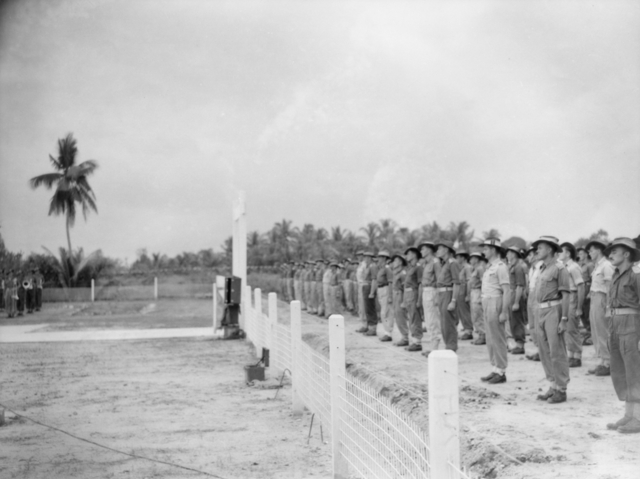
The opening ceremony on 28 December 1945.

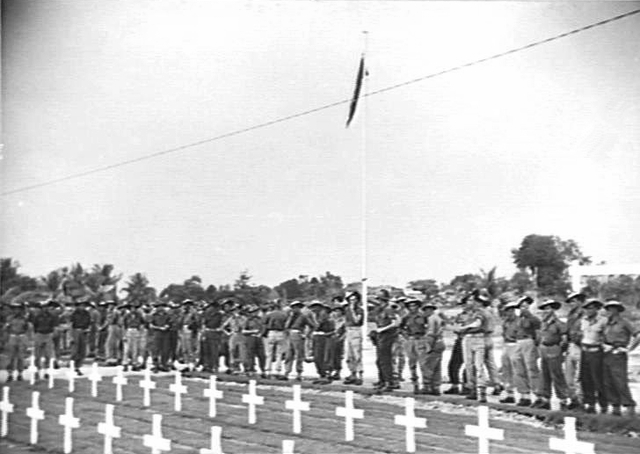
Grave inspection after the opening ceremony.

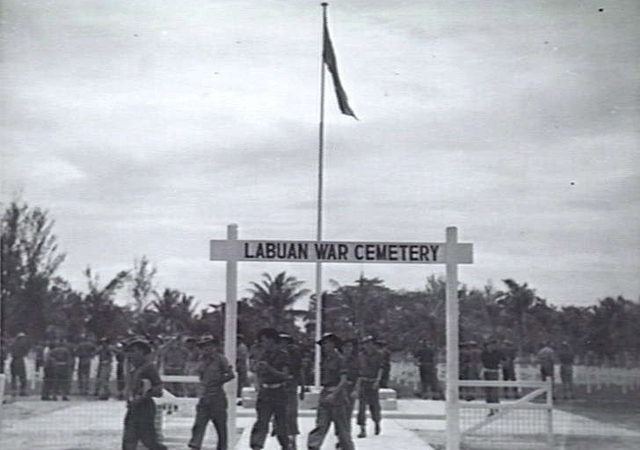
Australian troops leaving the cemetery after the opening ceremony.

== See also ==
- Cheras War Cemetery
- Taiping War Cemetery
- Kranji War Cemetery
- Terendak Garrison Cemetery
