= Lynette Silver =

Australian historian and author (born 1945)

Lynette Silver AM, MBE
- Born: 1945 (age 80–81)
- Occupations: Military historian, author

Lynette Ramsay Silver, AM, MBE (born 1945) is an Australian historian and author. She has written a number of books dealing with Australian and military history.

== Career ==
Silver's first book, published in 1986, A Fool's Gold?, deals with the first discoveries of payable gold in Australia and was written after she discovered archival documents "lost" for 134 years. Her next book, The Battle of Vinegar Hill, first published in 1989, is the first (and only) full account of the Irish insurrection Castle Hill convict rebellion of 1804. Sandakan – A Conspiracy of Silence, published in 1998, uncovered the fate of 2428 Australian and British prisoners of war who died at the Sandakan POW Camp in Borneo or on one of the death marches, and investigated the coverup of a failed rescue mission Operation Kingfisher (World War II). 2004's The Bridge at Parit Sulong is an investigation into the massacre of allied prisoners by Japanese soldiers in Malaya in 1942. Further books, mainly related to military history, followed.

Silver was awarded an honorary Medal of the Order of Australia (OAM) in 2004 for "service to veterans and their families, particularly as an organiser of battlefield tours and commemorative services". She was advanced to Member of the Order of Australia (AM) in the 2019 Australia Day Honours for "significant service to the community through historical battlefield tours and commemorative services", and appointed a Member of the Order of the British Empire (MBE) in the 2024 New Year Honours for services to British families of Second World War personnel.

== Personal life ==
Silver is married and has two children and three grandchildren.

== Books ==
- A Fool's Gold? (1986)
- The Battle of Vinegar Hill (1989)
- The Heroes of Rimau: Unravelling the Mystery of One of World War II's Most Daring Raids (1990)
- Krait; The fishing boat that went to war (1992)
- Pot Pourri and other Secrets from the Garden (1992)
- My Ballet Book (1992)
- Making...Friendship Bands (1994)
- Flowercraft (1995)
- Papercraft: Paper-Making & Paper-Mache (1995)
- Playing Skipping and Elastic Games (1995)
- Fabulous furphies; Ten great myths from Australia's past (1997)
- Sandakan: A Conspiracy of Silence (1998)
- On This Rock: The Church of St Peter Hornsby 1898–1998 (1998)
- Great Kids' Games (1999)
- The Bridge at Parit Sulong (2004)
- Marcel Caux – A Life Unravelled (2005)
- Deadly Secrets: The Singapore Raids 1943–45 (2010)
- Blood Brothers (2010)
- In The Mouth of the Tiger (2014)
- Billy: My Life as a Teenage POW (2016)
