= Sandakan death marches =

Forced marches in Borneo during WWII

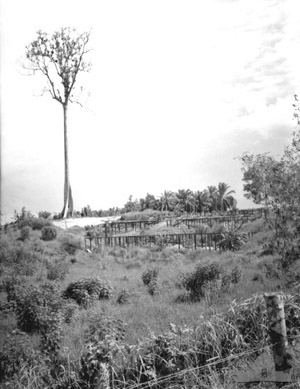
Sandakan POW camp on 24 October 1945, a few months after the camp was destroyed by the retreating Japanese troops. In No. 1 compound (pictured), graves containing the bodies of 300 Australian and British prisoners were later discovered. It is believed they were the men left at the camp after the second series of marches. Each grave contained several bodies, in some cases as many as 10.

A series of death marches in Borneo, from Sandakan to Ranau, resulted in the deaths of 2,434 Allied prisoners of war held captive by the Empire of Japan during the Pacific campaign of World War II at the Sandakan camp, North Borneo. By the end of the war, of all the prisoners who had been incarcerated at Sandakan and Ranau, only six Australians survived, all of whom had escaped. It is widely considered to be the single worst atrocity suffered by Australian servicemen during the Second World War.

== Background ==
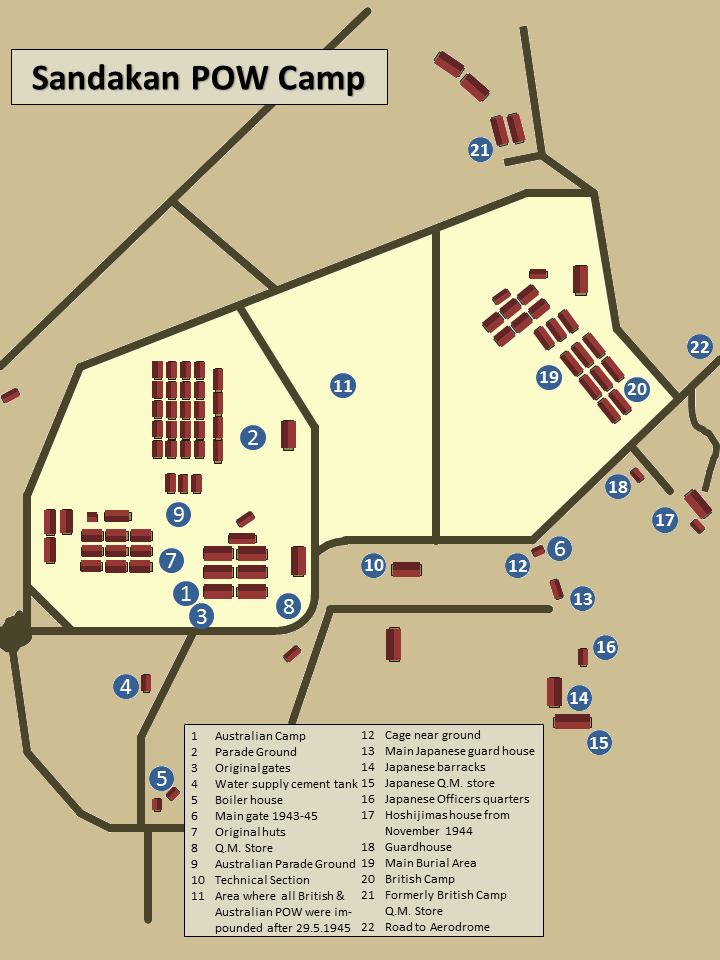
Layout of the Sandakan POW camp.

In 1942 and 1943, Australian and British POWs who had been captured at the Battle of Singapore in February 1942 were shipped to North Borneo to construct a military airstrip and prisoner-of-war camps at Sandakan, North Borneo (Sabah). As on the Burma Railway the prisoners were forced to work at gunpoint, and were often beaten whilst also receiving very little food or medical attention. In August 1943, with the intention of controlling the enlisted men by removing any commanders, most officer-ranked prisoners were moved from Sandakan to the Batu Lintang camp at Kuching. Conditions for the remaining prisoners deteriorated sharply following the officers' removal. Rations were further reduced, and sick prisoners were also forced to work on the airstrip. After construction had been completed, the prisoners initially remained at the camp. In January 1945, with approximately 1,900 prisoners still alive, the advancing Allies managed to successfully bomb and destroy the airfield. It was at this time, with Allied landings anticipated shortly, that camp commandant Captain Hoshijima Susumi decided to move the remaining prisoners westward into the mountains to the town of Ranau, a distance of approximately 260 kilometres (160 mi). He claimed that this was an order of Lieutenant General Baba Masao, commanding officer of the 37th Japanese Army. The former military airstrip is now known as Sandakan Airport, which serves Sandakan town.

== Events ==
=== First marches ===
The first phase of marches across wide marshland, dense jungle, and then up the eastern slope of Mount Kinabalu occurred between January and March 1945. The Japanese had selected 470 prisoners who were thought to be fit enough to carry baggage and supplies for the accompanying Japanese battalions relocating to the western coast. In several groups the POWs, all of whom were either malnourished or suffering serious illness, started the journey originally under the intention of reaching Jesselton (Kota Kinabalu). Although the route took nine days, they were given enough rations for only four days. As on the Bataan Death March, any POWs who were not fit enough or collapsed from exhaustion were either killed or left to die en route. Upon reaching Ranau, the survivors were halted and ordered to construct a temporary camp. As one historian later commented: "Those who survived... were herded into insanitary and crowded huts to then die from dysentery. By 26 June, only five Australians and one British soldier were still alive."

=== Second marches ===
A second series of marches began on 29 May 1945 with approximately 536 prisoners. The new Sandakan camp commander, Captain Takakuwa Takuo, ordered the prisoners towards Ranau in groups of about fifty with accompanying Japanese guards. The march lasted for twenty-six days, with prisoners even less fit than those in the first marches had been, provided with fewer rations and often forced to forage for food. Compound No. 1 of the Sandakan camp was destroyed in an attempt to erase any evidence of its existence. Only 183 prisoners managed to reach Ranau. Upon their arrival on 24 June 1945, participants of the second marches discovered that only six prisoners from the first series of marches during January were still alive.

=== Final march ===
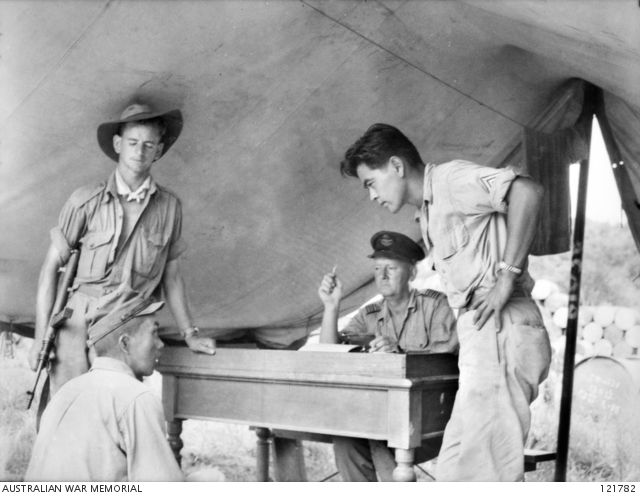
Sergeant Hosotani Naoji (left, seated) of the Kenpeitai (Japanese military police) at Sandakan is interrogated by Squadron Leader F. G. Birchall (second right) of the Missing Servicemen Section and Sergeant Mamo (right) of the Allied Translator and Interpreter Section on 26 October 1945. Naoji confessed to shooting two Australian POWs and five Chinese civilians. (Photographer: Frank Burke.)

Approximately 250 people were left at Sandakan after the second march departed. Most prisoners were so ill that the Japanese initially intended to let them starve to death, forcing many to scavenge in the surrounding forest for food. However, on 9 June 1945 it was decided to send another group of 75 men on a final march. The remaining men were so weak that none survived beyond 50 kilometres (31 mi). As each man collapsed from exhaustion, he was shot by a Japanese guard. All remaining prisoners left at Sandakan who could not walk either were killed or died from a combination of starvation and sickness before the Japanese surrender on 15 August 1945. Many Japanese soldiers also died from starvation, with some even turning to cannibalism in order to preserve their fighting effectiveness.

== Operation Kingfisher ==
Operation Kingfisher was a planned rescue operation for servicemen at the Sandakan camp that was abandoned in early 1945. The operation is said to have been derailed by inaccurate intelligence. The exact details of the proposed operation are unclear as the operation itself was top-secret, but is said to have involved Australian paratroopers being dropped into the vicinity to evacuate prisoners.

There is no specific recorded date for the cancellation of the operation, though the reassignment of the Agas 1 team to a West Coast mission due to "information received about the POW's" places the time period of the abandonment at around 16–19 April. Agas reconnaissance missions continued to compile reports and survey the camp until early June, with Major Gort Chester requesting advice on how act on his compiled evidence to no response. The Agas team would later, incorrectly, report that there were no prisoners left in the camp, leading to the official end of any planned operation.

There are arguments as to whether the operation itself was feasible. Reports produced by the Agas team in May 1945 ruled the evacuation of prisoners by air infeasible due to the destruction of the Ranau airfield. Evacuation by land to awaiting submarines was considered, but quickly abandoned of the grounds of the terrible condition of the men. Australian paratroopers, as well as Royal Marines, were placed on standby for the operation and were ready to go ahead upon receiving up-to-date information from the Agas team, but said intelligence was never received.

The blame for the operation's failure was the subject of much controversy once the full reports of the camps death toll were received. General Thomas Blamey and other Australian officers attempted to shift blame onto General Douglas MacArthur on the grounds that he did not provide adequate air support. However, such reports imply that the Allies were on the brink of action and have been proven to be inaccurate. It is generally assumed that the decision to call off the operation before the surveillance was completed was made by the Australian military.

== Aftermath ==
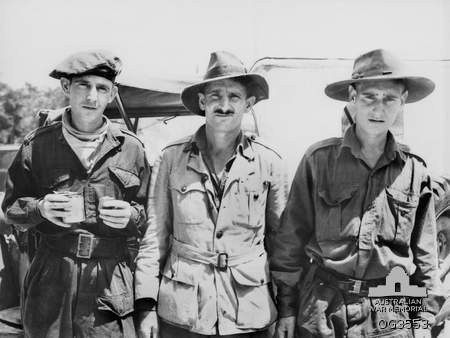
Nelson Short, William H. Sticpewich and Keith Botterill; three of the six Australians believed to be the sole remaining survivors of 2,700 POW of the death marches.

Due to a combination of a lack of food and brutal treatment at the hands of the Japanese, only 38 prisoners were left alive at Ranau by the end of July. All were too unwell and weak to do any work, and it was ordered that any remaining survivors should be shot. They were killed by the guards during August, possibly up to 12 days after the end of the war on 14 August. It has been estimated that in total, approximately 16% of the population of North Borneo were killed during the three years of Japanese occupation.

In total, only six Australian servicemen managed to escape. During the second marches, Gunner Owen Campbell and Bombardier Richard Braithwaite managed to escape into the jungle, where they were assisted by locals and eventually rescued by Allied units. During July, Private Nelson Short, Warrant Officer William Sticpewich, Private Keith Botterill, and Lance Bombardier William Moxham managed to escape from Ranau and were also helped by the local people, who fed them and hid them from the Japanese until the end of the war. Of the six survivors, only four (Sticpewich, Botterill, Short, and Campbell) gave evidence at the various war crimes trials in both Tokyo and Rabaul. The world was able to receive eyewitness accounts of the crimes and atrocities committed. Captain Hoshijima was found guilty of war crimes and hanged on 6 April 1946. Captain Takakuwa and his second-in-charge, Captain Watanabe Genzo, were likewise found guilty of perpetrating the murder and massacres of prisoners-of-war and were hanged and shot on 6 April 1946 and 16 March 1946, respectively.

== Commemorations ==
In 1948 the Australian journalist Colin Simpson visited British North Borneo to retrace the steps of the Sandakan Death Marches and later record the memoirs of six survivors for a radio documentary for the Australian Broadcasting Commission's Australian Walkabout programme. The script was later published as Six from Borneo (1948).

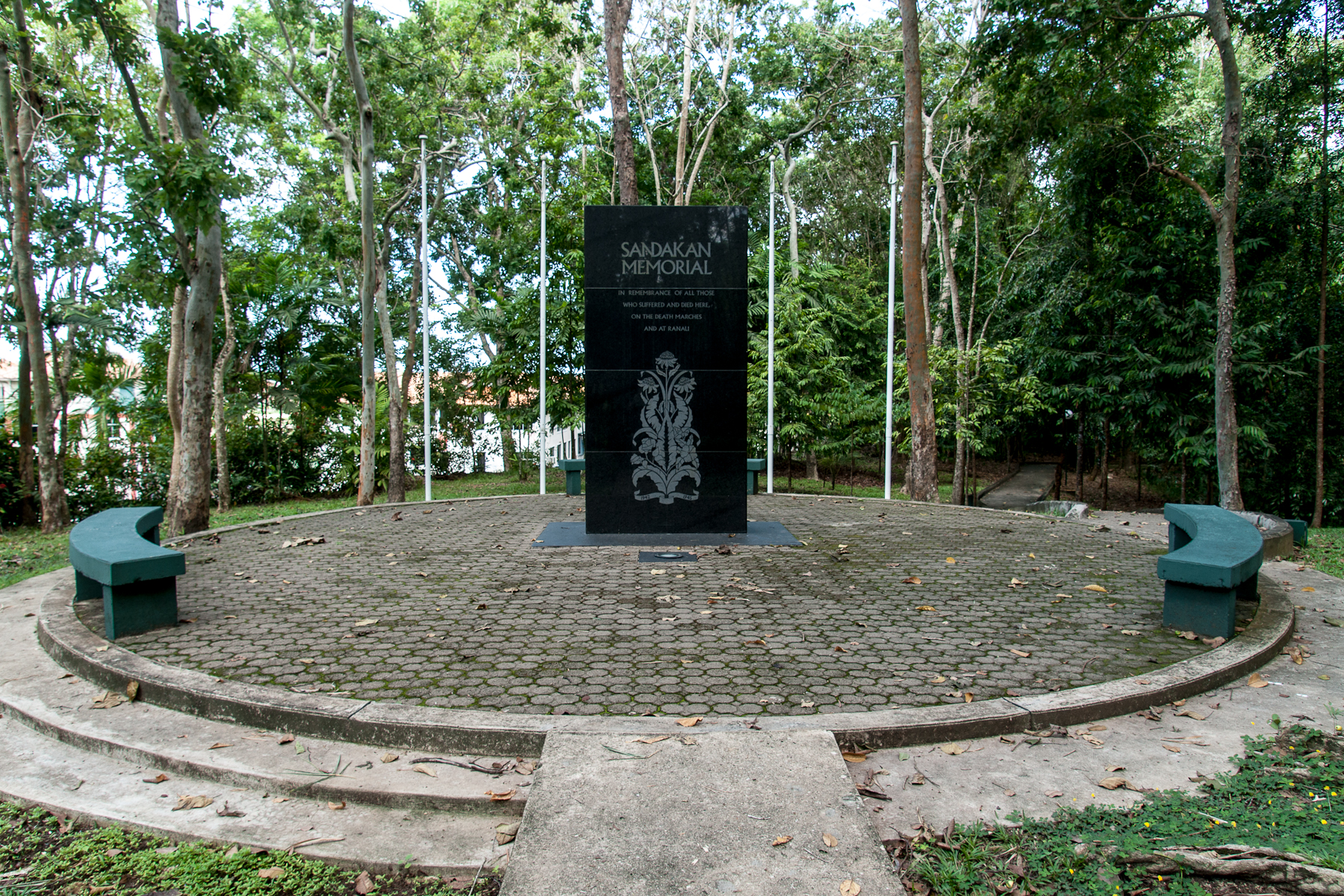
The memorial park in Sandakan stands today on the former site of the POW Camp.

A War Memorial and Gardens of remembrance were built at Kundasang, Sabah in 1962 to commemorate those who had died at Sandakan and Ranau.

The Sandakan Death Marches have been dramatised in the 2004 oratorio Sandakan Threnody — a threnody being a hymn of mourning, composed as a memorial to a dead person. The oratorio was written by Australian composer Jonathan Mills, whose father survived a term of imprisonment at Sandakan in 1942–43.

In 2011, Year 9 and 10 Drama Students at Toodyay District High School, in Western Australia, re-dramatised an updated version of the original 1947 ABC Radio play Six From Borneo with help from the Toodyay community, including Toodyay Community Radio, the Shire of Toodyay and Toodyay RSL. The launch of the Six From Borneo Project was attended by the Malaysian Consul General Puan Hamidah Ashari, Member for Moore Grant Woodhams MLA, Military Historian Lynette Silver, relatives of Sandakan POWs and Toodyay community members. On 9 September 2011, audio excerpts of the original recording were played on ABC radio (WA Perth 720) for the first time since 1947, along with audio excerpts of the rerecording. The play was due to be broadcast on Toodyay Community Radio in late 2011 and was then to be offered to other community radio stations across Australia. A copy of the rerecording has been submitted to the National Film and Sound Archive of Australia and to the ABC library in Perth, Western Australia.

Between 2012 and 2014, Western Australian students participating in the Premier's ANZAC Student Tour visited Sandakan, Ranau and various sites of significance along the route of the death marches to learn about the atrocities committed and raise greater awareness (particularly among youth) about the experiences of Australian POWs in South-East Asia during WW2.

Sandakan was referred to by Prime Minister Shinzo Abe in his speech to the Australian parliament on 8 July 2014. It was the first speech to the parliament by a Japanese leader.

== Delayed release of records and testimonies following the trials ==
After the war much of the information surrounding the events of the marches were kept from the families and the general public. In the beginning this was attributable to the conflicting information between the records provided to the Army and those recovered at the camp, as well as the conflicting survivor testimonies. These differing accounts meant that many men had the wrong recorded date or wrong cause of death recorded as the records at the camp would often record the deaths of executed prisoners to be as a result of illness. Although records were eventually rectified, the information immediately proceeding the war presented a very complex and contradictory recounting of the camp's events.

However, after the war crimes trials in 1946, the reasoning behind this concealment changed from lack of reliable information to that of sparing families the grief and torment, with the rationale that the events of the marches were too terrible to be disclosed. In the midst of the trials, the Press, while not explicitly asked to conceal information, agreed with the government to only disclose the basic details of the camp. Most notably, the Army record keepers were also kept in the dark and relied upon press releases in order to gain access to testimonies, records and general information associated with the war crimes investigations.

It was during this time that investigations into the camp were undertaken. This included collecting bodies for the war graves commission and the recovery of the camp records. The results of this inquiry, after investigations concluded in 1947, were released to the relevant government agencies to be sealed for a minimum of 30 years. It is worth noting that there are some that attribute this withholding of information as an attempt to conceal the military's lack of intervention in this matter, both in regards to the relative failure of the Singapore campaign and the abandonment of Project Kingfisher, although these allegations have not been confirmed.

Very little information was released to the public in the time between this sealing and the eventual upsurge of the narratives in the 1980s. While some books pertaining to the movements of these units during the war were released earlier, these did not pertain to the time that these units spent in captivity. Family members attempting to gain information from 1945 to the unsealing of these documents were presented with very little information, usually only being provided a confirmation of death. British families found gathering this information particularly difficult. It wasn't until the efforts of investigators, historians and soldiers brought these narratives to light in the 1980s and 1990s that Sandakan entered the public consciousness again, and for many families this was their first exposure to a full account of what happened to their relatives.

== POW route ==
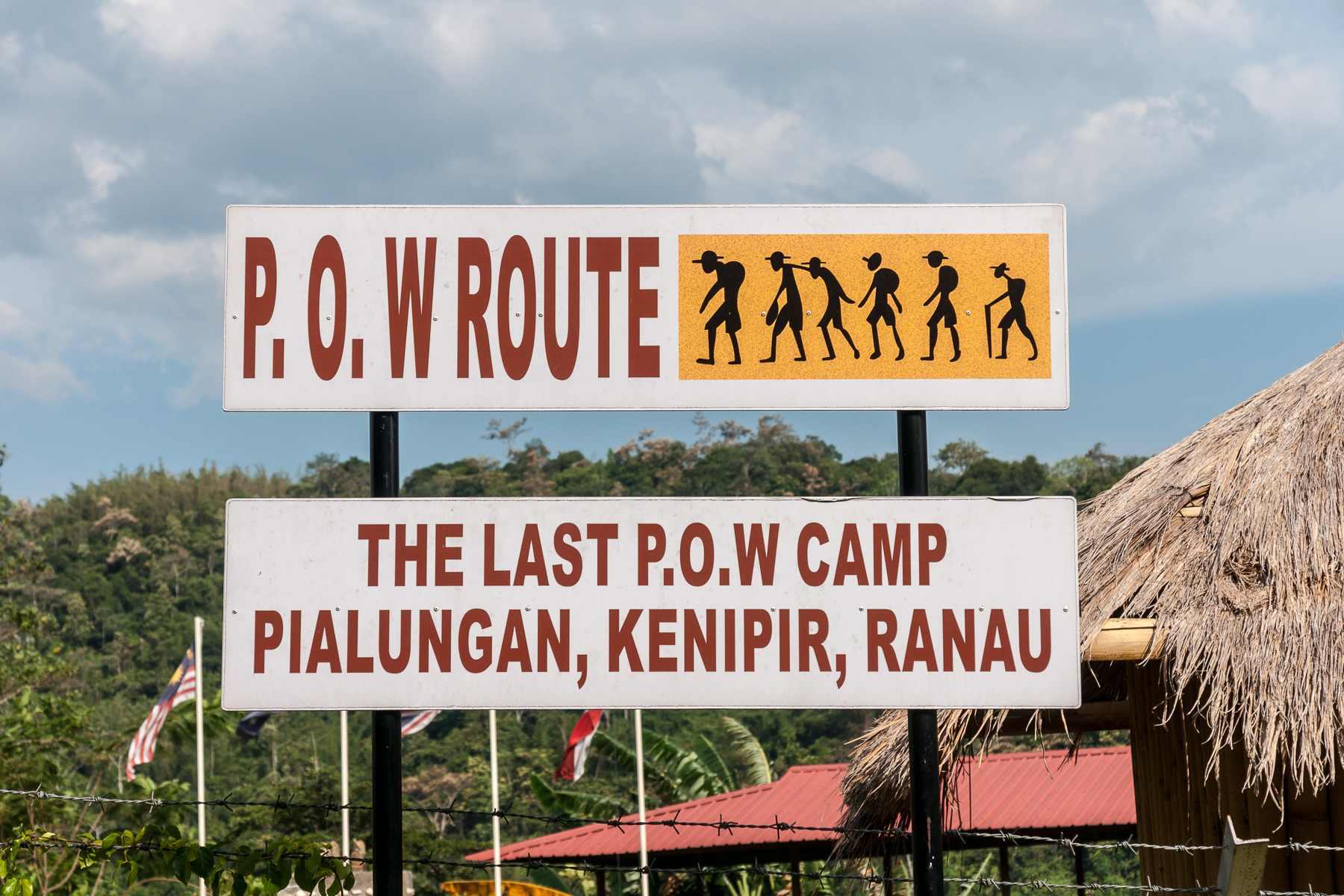
A sign board marking the "POW Route".

The "POW Route" during the three death marches series was documented in 1945 by British and Australian military. The route begins in Sandakan and ends at the "Last Camp" at Ranau. The stations of the route are now marked with a sign board.

Since 2005, the route of the track became a heated dispute between two Australian war historians, Dr Kevin Smith and Lynette Silver. Dr. Smith claimed that at Telupid, the track veered to the right towards Miruru via the Liwagu Valley, but Dr. Silver argued that it never went to Miruru, according to the hand-drawn map found by the Australian Body Recovery team of the Office of Australian War Graves and later audited in 2012 by the Australian Army History and Mapping units. The argument was set to rest as Silver's evidence was supported by two of the last remaining trail cutters, Tuaty Akau and Zudin, who lived at the time to establish the route under forced labour for the Imperial Japanese Army (IJA) as well witnessing the horror of the death march. Both these witnesses have since died; Zudin on 14 May 2017 from breathing difficulties at the age of 87, and Tuaty on 29 October 2018 at the age of 105.

In 2011, the future Australian Prime Minister Scott Morrison (appointed in 2018) decided to complete the trek all the way from Telupid to Ranau together with two fellow Australian politicians, then-Defence Minister Jason Clare and Independent Rob Oakeshott in the six-day walk from Telupid to the Last Camp site in Ranau together with Lynette Silver, husband Neil Silver, and a group of 20 Australian students. In 2016, 27 Sutton Valence School (SVS) Combined Cadet Force (CCF) from the United Kingdom including seven girls visiting the route to mount a five-day trek through its forested section from Bauto to Muruk.

== See also ==
- Bataan Death March
- Batu Lintang camp
- Berhala Island, Sandakan
- Borneo campaign, 1945
- Tatsuji Suga
- Frederick Campling
- Operation Kingfisher (World War II)
- Six from Borneo
