= List of wars involving the Philippines =

This is a list of direct armed conflicts involving the Philippines since its founding during the Philippine revolution. This excludes battles widely regarded to be part of a larger war and isolated military engagements.

== List ==
Legend
Philippine victory
Philippine defeat
Stalemate
Ongoing conflict

=== Spanish colonial era ===
Wars involving the Philippines from the Philippine Revolution until the United States-Philippines War.

| Conflict (Note: Year indicates the duration of the Philippines' involvement in the war) | Philippines (and allies) (Note: Main combatants only. Minor involvement only included if it is by the Philippines) | Opponents (Note: Main combatants only) | Results |
|---|---|---|---|
| Philippine Revolution (1896-1899) | 1896–1897; Katipunan: Sovereign Tagalog Nation (until March 1897); Tejeros Government (March–November 1897); Republic of Biak-na-Bato (November–December 1897); 1898; Philippine Revolutionaries - Dictatorial Government (May–June) - Revolutionary Government (from June) United States (May) 1899: First Philippine Republic | 1896–1897; Spain: Captaincy General of the Philippines; Province of La Pampanga; 1898; Spain: Captaincy General of the Philippines; Province of La Pampanga; 1899; United States | Filipino Military Victory (Note: The Spanish–American War intruded into the ongoing revolution and efforts to establishing independence following its conclusion in the Treaty of Paris developed into the Philippine–American War.): Philippine Declaration of Independence from Spain; Philippine–American War started soon after; Cession of Philippine sovereignty by Spain to the United States through the Treaty of Paris; Filipinos control all of the Philippines except Manila and the port city of Cavite el Nuevo |
| Philippine–American War (1899–1902) | 1899–1902: (Note: The Philippine Republic was de jure dissolved in 1901 when Emilio Aguinaldo surrendered himself to the Americans and announce the Philippine people to lay down their weapons. However, his unofficial successor Miguel Malvar continued the fight without formal recognition of the people until his surrender in 1902.); Philippines: Negros Republic - Zamboanga Republic - Japanese volunteers; 1902–1906: Tagalog Republic •Irreconcilables | 1899–1902: United States: United States Military Government of the Philippine Islands; 1902–1913: United States - Insular Government of the Philippine Islands | American victory dissolution of Philippine republic: American occupation of the Philippines fully established; dissolution of the First Philippine Republic; Philippine Organic Act; The Philippines becomes an unincorporated territory of the United States and later, a U.S. Commonwealth (until 1946). |
| Moro Rebellion (1902–1913) | United States: Insular Government | Sultanate of Sulu; Maguindanao Sultanate; Lanao Confederacy First Philippine Republic (until 1901) | American victory resulting to Philippine total occupation and annexation: Total annexation of the Philippine Islands; Formation of the Department of Mindanao and Sulu |

=== American colonial era ===
Wars involving the United States-administered Philippines until July 4, 1946.

| Conflict | Philippines (and allies) | Opponents | Results |
|---|---|---|---|
| World War II (Pacific theater) (1941–1945 (Note: Although Japan had been invading and occupying parts of China since 1937, war was not officially declared. Japan would later attack Pearl Harbor on 7 December 1941, which brought the contained war in China into the wider global conflict.)) | Allies China United States United Kingdom See § Participants | Axis Japan See § Participants | Allied victory: Allied occupation of Japan; Removal of Japanese troops from China and retrocession of Taiwan to China; Liberation of Korea and Manchuria, followed by the division of Korea; Cession of Japanese-held islands in the Central Pacific Ocean to the United Nations, organized as the Trust Territory of the Pacific Islands; Seizure and annexation of South Sakhalin and the Kuril Islands by the Soviet Union |

=== Post-Independence era ===
Wars involving the Philippines from July 4, 1946 until today.

| Conflict | Philippines (and allies) | Opponents | Results |
|---|---|---|---|
| Hukbalahap Rebellion (1942–1954) | Philippines | Hukbalahap | Philippine government victory |
| Kamlon rebellion (1948-1955) | Philippines | Kamlon's Forces | Philippine government victory: Final surrender of Hadji Kamlon in 1955 |
| Korean War (1950–1953) | South Korea; United States | North Korea; China; Soviet Union | Stalemate: The Korean Peninsula remained divided into two states |
| Korean War (1950–1953) | Philippines (combat support) | North Korea; China; Soviet Union | Stalemate: The Korean Peninsula remained divided into two states |
| Vietnam War (1964–1973) | South Vietnam; United States | North Vietnam; Viet Cong and PRG; China; Soviet Union; North Korea | North Vietnamese victory: Unification of Vietnam |
| Vietnam War (1964–1973) | Philippines(civic support) | North Vietnam; Viet Cong and PRG; China; Soviet Union; North Korea | North Vietnamese victory: Unification of Vietnam |
| New People's Army Insurgency (1969–Present) | Government of the Philippines; Supported by: United States (advisors) | Communist Party of the Philippines; Supported by: China (until 1976) | Ongoing: NTF-ELCAC implemented; CPP-NPA leadership collapses; Elimination of all major rebel "front" units; Ongoing insurgency by NPA remnants |
| Moro conflict (1968–2019) | Philippines Supported by: United States (advisors); Australia; Indonesia; Malaysia (since 2001); Russia; China; International Monitoring Team (IMT): Brunei; Indonesia; Japan; Libya; Malaysia; Norway; European Union; Ilaga | Bangsamoro: MNLF (until 1996); MILF (until 2014); Former support: Libya (until 2011); Malaysia (until 2001); NDFP: MRLO; Jihadist groups: BIFF; ASG (1991–2024); Maute group (2013–2017); AKP (2014 – c. 2021); KIM (2011–2013); Rajah Sulaiman Movement (until 2005) | Peace agreements declared between the Government and the MILF/MNLF: Cessation of hostilities with the MNLF and MILF; Operation Enduring Freedom ended on 23 October 2017 dealing a heavy blow to jihadist forces, reducing their numbers significantly and recapturing all their territory; Bangsamoro Transition Authority established to govern the Bangsamoro Autonomous Region in Muslim Mindanao until 2025; Ongoing ISIL insurgency and sporadic clashes between MILF loyalist militias and against the government; The Bangsamoro Autonomous Region in Muslim Mindanao was officially ratified on February 22, 2019, and replaced the Autonomous Region in Muslim Mindanao |
