= Alejandro Suarez (constabulary) =

Filipino constabulary officer (1897–1965)

- Alejandro Suarez
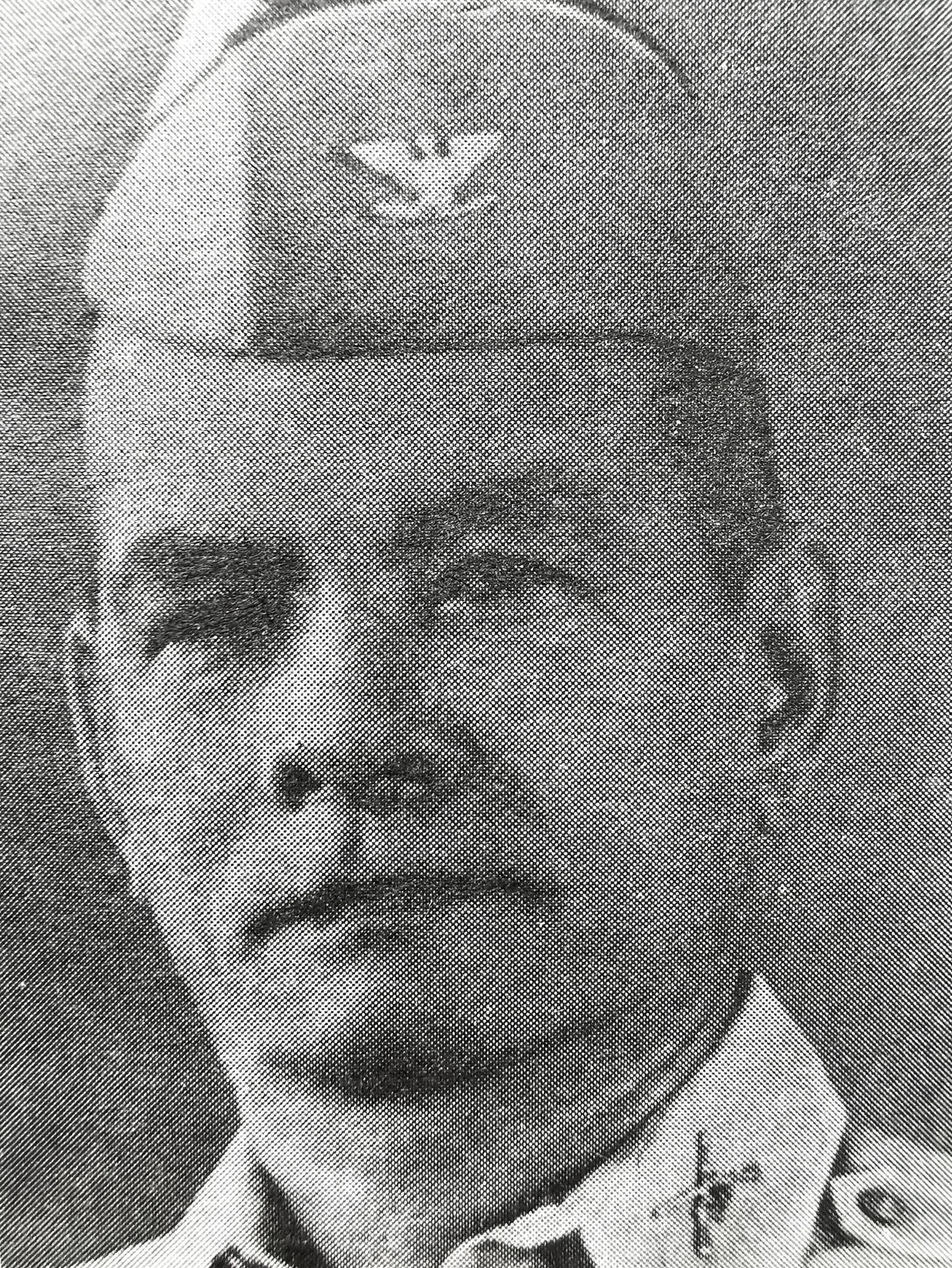
- Born: Alejandro Gallego y Suarez; March 14, 1897; Cotabato, Cotabato, General Captaincy of the Philippines
- Died: 1965 (aged 67–68); Siasi, Sulu
- Burial place: Siasi, Sulu
- Education: University of Michigan
- Spouse: Dintoy Tan - Suarez
- Relatives: Herminigildo Suarez (Uncle); Engracio Gulligado (Half-Brother)
- Military career
- Allegiance: Philippines; United States
- Branch: Philippine Commonwealth Army; Philippine Constabulary
- Service years: 1914–1948
- Rank: Colonel
- Nickname: Sandro
- Service number: O-1174
- Units: 2nd Moro Company; 14th Mindanao Company; 125th PC Company; 112th PC Company; Sulu PC; Antique PC; Cagayan PC; Lanao PC; 81st Infantry Division
- Commands: Mindanao Military Zone; 61st Infantry Regiment; Sulu Area Command; 125th Infantry Regiment; Sulu PC; Lanao PC; 118th PC Company; 125th PC Company; 112th PC Company
- Known for: Commander, Sulu Area Command
- Conflicts: Battle of Bato-Bato(1944) Battle of Bongao(1943); Battle of Lanao(1942); Battle of Zamboanga(1942) Battle of Jolo (1941)
- Awards: Distinguished Conduct Star; Mindanao Campaign with two Bronze Stars; Silver Star; Purple Heart; Philippine Defense Service Ribbon; Philippine Liberation Ribbon; Asiatic-Pacific Theater Ribbon; Long Service Medal; Victory Medal

Alejandro Suarez(March 14, 1897 – 1965), is a Filipino constabulary officer who commanded the guerilla forces in Tawi-Tawi and Sulu Islands in southern Philippines during Japanese Occupation of the Philippines during World War II. He served as Constabulary enlisted man from 1914 to 1920 and as officer from 1920 to 1948. His 27 years experience as constabulary in Mindanao was his edge in unifying Moros and Christians alike of his guerilla force in Sulu Archipelago and North Borneo.

== Background and education ==
Suarez a Spanish-Moro mestizo and a mixed Christian and Muslim. He was born in Cotabato City on 1898 to a Spanish father surnamed Gallego and a Maguindanaoan mother surnamed Suarez. He was left at the care of his mother when his father went back to Spain and never returned after Spain surrendered to the Americans. He grew up under the care of his uncle Herminigildo Suarez and he adopted his surname. After his elementary education he took correspondence course while working at the farm. He has a half brother named Engracio Gulligado who was part of his Guerilla force during Japanese occupation.

At the age of 17 he enlisted and entered military service. He befriended an American military officer and encouraged him to take the examination for a commission. His good looks and height, and his knowledge of the local dialect, came in handy for his military career. After passing the examination he was sent to a military training of Philippine Constabulary. Highly intelligent despite not going to school, he taught himself to red, write, and speak English. He enrolled at University of Michigan in 1926 after he was sent to the American for Special Military Courses.

=== Police and civil work ===
He led in neutralizing Moro outlaws and brigands in Lanao and Sulu. Aside from fighting cattle-rustling, prosecuting buyers of stolen cattle and he worked to solve the murder of the American Sulu Governor James Fugate. He saved Mr. Edward Kuder the superintendent of Schools for Sulu from his assassin a Moro Juramentado (amok).

Aside from Police work he also served as tax collector of Lanao and Sulu, Auxiliary Justice of Peace in Lanao. He was appointed as Deputy Governor of Lanao and Sulu Provinces. He was appointed Inspector for Antique and Cagayan before transferred back to Sulu as Inspector and Acting Governor.

=== Military career ===
Suarez enlisted in the 2nd Moro Company as a Private when he enlisted on June 9, 1914. He was involved in numerous pacification campaigns and encounters with outlaw bands and bandits. He rose to the ranks of Lance Corporal, Corporal, and then Sergeant. After passing the stiff and competitive examination Suarez was commissioned as 3rd Lieutenant was assigned as detachment commander in Pata Island, Sulu in 1920 before being transferred to Wao, Lanao. After three years he was promoted to 2nd Lieutenant and assigned to 14th Mindanao Company based in Cotabato on November 14, 1923. Realizing promotions are best given to more qualified personnel he went to United States for special military courses after his American superiors seen potentials with him. He attended University of Michigan where he enrolled as special student in 1926 - 1927 at his own expense. When he came back he was promoted to First Lieutenant and was appointed commander of 125th PC Company based in Asturias, Sulu. He later commanded 112th PC Company and Camp Romandier in Luuk and 113th PC Company and Camp Anders at Panamao all in Sulu Islands. For 10 years he has commanded these sensitive posts in Sulu. He commanded 118th PC Company based in Tagbili, Sulu and 9th PC Company in Siasi, Sulu. While here he befriended Kamlon who would later rebel against Philippine Government (Kamlon Rebellion) after the war. He became provincial commanders of Lanao PC in 1938 and later Sulu PC before the start of War. He also promoted to captain and was transferred to a relatively peaceful Siasi Island.

In 1937, Suarez was promoted to captain and transferred to province of Antique as Provincial Inspector and after 2 years he was transferred to Cagayan province where he was promoted to Major on September 29, 1941. When world war 2 was looming over the horizon he was transferred back to Sulu as he appointed by President Manuel Quezon as provincial inspector and acting governor in early December 1941. He assumed office on December 17, 1941, replacing Lieutenant Colonel Pio Rosas, PC.

=== World War II ===
On December 24, 1941, Japanese landed in Jolo, Sulu Major Suarez led small armed force consist of Army soldiers and Constabularies in defending the island against advancing enemy units at Kaunayan Beach, Patikul. During the encounter he caught a bayonet thrust in the left forearm during the hand-to-hand fighting. About 20,000 Japanese landed in Jolo to make it as staging area for the invasion of British North Borneo. He ordered his men to break up but not surrendered. Keep their arms and wait for his return as he will confide with General Guy O. Fort the commander of 81st Division. On the way to Zamboanga he made side trip to Siasi and in Tawi-Tawi. He likewise advised them against surrendering. Upon reaching Zamboanga he was persuaded not to return to Sulu but render his service there but he made sure he was able to send supplies and funds for his men in Tawi-Tawi. He took part on its defensive campaign in Zamboanga against invading Japanese and he was ordered to report to 81st Division HQ in Dansalan, Lanao. He was promoted by General Guy O. Fort to Lieutenant Colonel to command Maranao Bolo Battalion. When the order to surrender was received by General Fort he made it known he wants to return to his men in Sulu who were waiting for him. However, he was prevailed by his superiors to obey the orders and join the general surrender. He became prisoner of war when Fort surrender on May 19, 1942.

While at the concentration camp in Cotabato, Japanese and puppet government officials offered him lucrative government positions. He feigning illness, he turned down the offers. He was already planning his escape and rejoin his men. On January 21, 1943 he made his successful escaped and dash to freedom with the help of Sulu businessman Sabtal Usman a moro businessman. He reached Bato-Bato in Tawi-Tawi after few days travel mostly done at night. His advanced party of Fighting 21 under 2Lieutenant Abdulrahim Imao contacted 2Lieutenant Alejandro Trespeces in Bongao and Captain Maximiano Velasquez in Jolo.

Upon reaching Sulu he issued General Order 1 to assume command of Sulu Guerilla forces on February 10, 1943. Colonel Wendell Fertig commander of 10th Military District subsequently designated the Sulu Guerilla Organization to 125th Infantry Regiment. He requested councilors to send trainees/volunteers to Languyan, Tawi-tawi. He selected Captain Maximiano Velasquez a former district superintendent before the war as his executive officer.

=== Sulu Area Command ===
Later the regiment was designated to Sulu Area Command after Suarez received messaged from General Douglas MacAthur ordering him to established such command on February 12, 1944, independent from 10th Military District of Colonel Wendell Fertig. Territorial jurisdiction entire Sulu Archipelago. He established his headquarters in Bato-Bato and divided Sulu to four defense sectors for tactical and administrative purposes. Two of his officers in this organization was the Espaldon brothers Ernesto and Romulo. Romulo would later became a Rear Admiral of Philippine Navy and appointed first commander of AFP Southern Command.

He also organized civil government in Sulu and appointed deputy governor Shiek Yasin Bagis. Where they traveled to different island and municipalities to appoint local leaders loyal to commonwealth. His command aided the liberating American and Australian forces in September 1945. When 41st US Infantry Division landed in Bato-bato they were greeted by the guerillas as Japanese has already been neutralized. He facilitated the surrender of Kamlon who was fighting for the Japanese.

After the liberation of the Philippines of Japanese occupation and reestablishing of Philippine Commonwealth Government by President Sergio Osmeña Sr., Sulu Area Command, Guerillas in Zamboanga, and Misamis was integrated to 61st Infantry Regiment based in Pasonanca in Zamboanga. Suarez was appointed as its commander in mid 1945 after the war ended.

== Post War ==
The Government established Military Districts to control forces in the Philippines in September 1945. Suarez was appointed to command Mindanao Military Area based in Iligan, Lanao and was promoted to full Colonel. He moved to Lanao and took command of the Filipino forces in the Mindanao. In 1946 Mindanao Military District were abolished and replaced with IV Military Area based in Cagayan de Oro, Misamis Oriental.

=== Honors & Awards ===
During his more than 30 years of military service, he was awarded and entitled to the following awards and decorations.

Philippine Military Awards

- Distinguished Conduct Star
- Mindanao Campaign with 2 Bronze Stars
- Philippine Defense Service Ribbon
- Philippine Liberation Ribbon
- Victory Medal

US Military Awards

- US Silver Star
- Purple Heart
- Asiatic-Pacific Theater Ribbon
- Long Service Medal
- World War II Victory Medal

=== Silver Star ===
For gallantry in action, outstanding devotion to duty and exceptional bravery in making preparation for the landing of American Forces in the Sulu Archipelago, Lieutenant Colonel ALEJANDRO SUAREZ, CO, Sulu Area Command, awarded the Silver Star Medal by Major General JENS A DOE, CG, 41st Infantry Division, U. S. Army. Extract of Section I, General Orders No. 63 Headquarters 41st Infantry Division, dated 6 June 1945 is quoted hereunder:

HEADQUARTERS 41ST INFANTRY DIVISION

Office of the Commanding General APO 41

GENERAL ORDERS 6 June 1945

NO. 65(EXTRACT)

I. AWARD OF THE SILVER STAR

"By direction of the President, under the provisions

of the Act of Congress approved 9 July 1918 (Bulletin 45, 1915),

a Silver Star is awarded by the Commanding General, 41st Infantry Division, to the following officers:

"Lieutenant Colonel ALEJANDRO SUAREZ , Philippine Army.

For gallantry in action on Jolo Island, Sulu Archipelago, Philippine Islands, on 9 April 1945.

Lieutenant Colonel Suarez displayed outstanding devotion to duty and exceptional bravery in making preparations for the landing of American forces on the island. He built large fires on shore to mark the landing beach for the landing force. After the landing, he determined the disposition of enemy troops and discovered the main enemy force at great danger to his own life. The gallantry and devotion to duty displayed by Lieutenant Colonel Suarez during the landing inspired the American Soldiers and enabled them to successfully capture the city of Jolo with little opposition.

Home address: Siasi, Sulu."

KENNETH S. SWEANY,

Colonel, G.S.C., Chief of Staff."

OFFICIAL STAFF EUGENE S. TARR, Lt. Col. A.G.D. Adjutant General

== Personal life and post military career ==
Suarez met a soft-spoken Chinese mestiza Dintoy Tan while assigned at Siasi Island, Sulu in 1937. Despite his rank and stature it took him a year to get her nod. They were married on August 25, 1938, before a Justice of Peace in Siasi, Sulu. They have 3 children and later adopted his half-brother's son.

Suarez military career came to an end in 1948 when he retired from service. He spent the rest of his career in pacification, reconstruction, and rehabilitation of moroland specially Sulu. He help the government in the negotiation for surrender of Hadji Kamlon who launched several rebellions from 1947 to 1955. He died in 1965 leaving his wife and children but he left not just legacy but outmost respect of Tausug, Chistians, and Saman, Badjaos, and people of Moroland.

== Legacy ==
Camp Alejandro Suarez in Bongao, Tawi-Tawi was named in his honor. It is the home of Tawi-Tawi Provincial Police Office. Barangay Suarez in Iligan City, Lanao Del Norte was named after him were Camp Climaco Pintoy is located. It is also known as Camp Pintoy Suarez due to its location. Another camp in Barangay Menzi, Isabela City, Basilan was named after him, Camp Suarez Menzi home of Basilan Provincial Police Office. Suarez Street in Jolo, Sulu was named in his honor of his dedication and contribution to the Province.

== See also ==
- Romulo Espaldon
- Albert Kwok
- 41st US Infantry Division
- Philippine Resistance against Japan
