= Dáyâng ásu =

Dáyâng ásu (in Pampangan) or dugong aso (in Tagalog) is a pejorative term meaning "sons of bitches" (lit. 'dog-blooded'), and may refer to:

- the Pampangan political-economic elite during the Philippine Revolution;
- the Macabebe Scouts deployed during the Philippine–American War;
- Dugong Aso: Mabuting Kaibigan, Masamang Kaaway, a 2001 Philippine film;
- Dáyâng Ásu (2015), a political-noir film.
