= Jesselton revolt =

1943–1944 revolt against Japan in Borneo

- Part of World War II
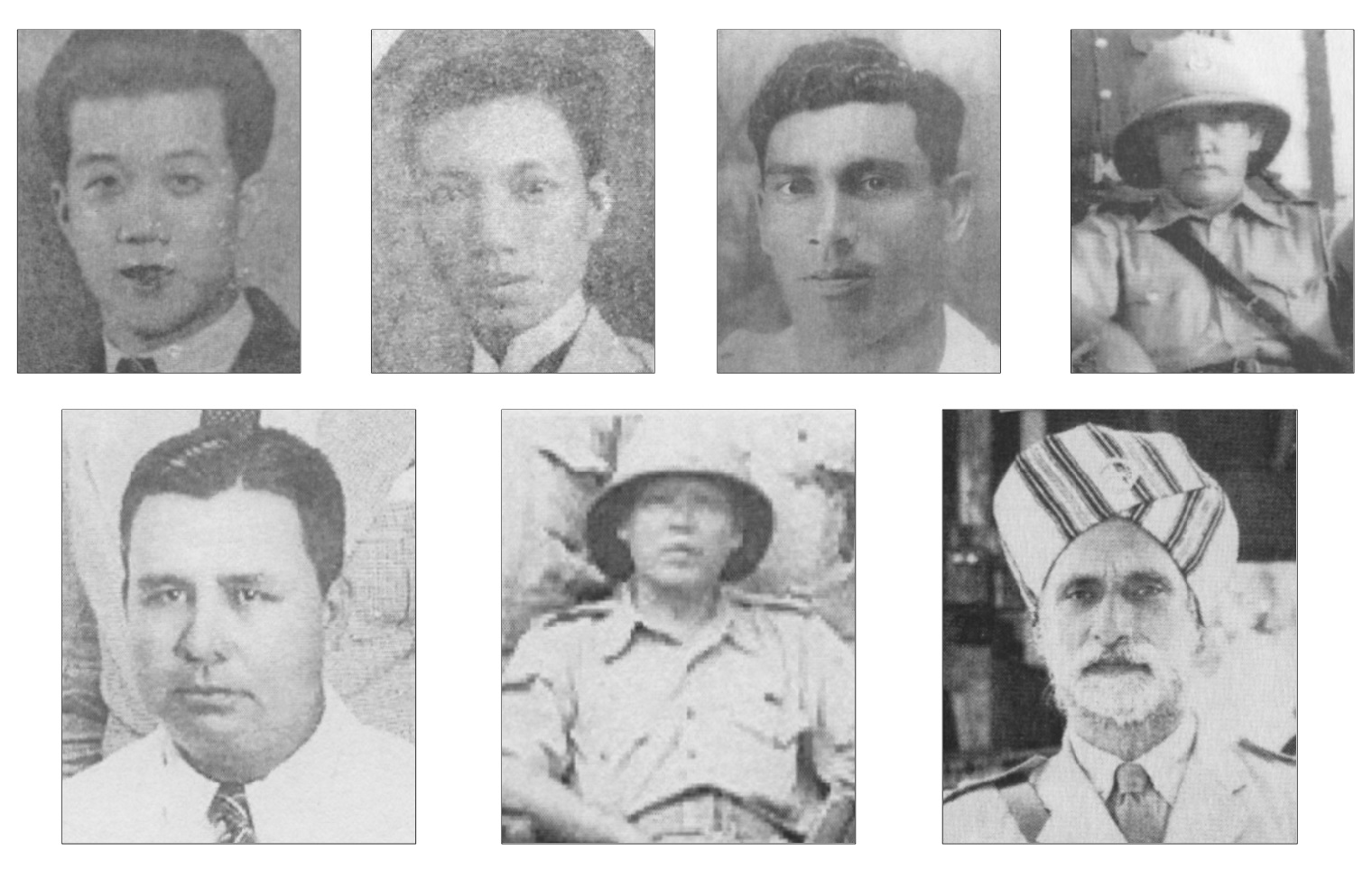
- Revolt leaders aside from Albert Kwok: (top row, from left) Kong Tze Phui, Lim Keng Fatt, Imam Marajukim, and Charles Peter; (bottom row) Jules Stephens, Li Tet Phui, and Subedar Dewa Singh
Date	9 October 1943 – 21 January 1944; 82 years ago (3 months, 1 week and 5 days)
Location	Jesselton, British North Borneo
Result	Japanese victory

Belligerents
Kinabalu Guerrillas Defence Forces	Empire of Japan • Occupied British Borneo

Commanders and leaders
Albert Kwok (executed); Hiew Syn Yong (executed); Kong Tze Phui (executed); Li Tet Phui (executed); Tsen Tsau Kong (executed); Charles Peter (executed); Jules Stephens (executed); Budh Singh (executed); Sohan Singh (executed); Panglima Ali (executed); Orang Tua Arshad (executed); Musah; Duallis; Jemalul; Saruddin (executed); Subedar Dewa Singh	Shimizu

Units involved
Overseas Chinese Defence Association • Chinese National Salvation Association; British North Borneo Constabulary; North Borneo Volunteer Force; North Bornean indigenous volunteers Philippine indigenous volunteers Members of Indian Imperial Police Limited arms support: United States Forces in the Philippines	Imperial Japanese Army • Kenpeitai

Strength
100 Chinese ≈200 Bornean/Philippine indigenous peoples (Note: Comprising Bajau-Binadan-Suluk/Dusun-Murut.)/Eurasian/Sikh Indian	≈Hundreds Japanese police (1943) ≈Thousands Japanese troops (post 1943)

Casualties and losses
324 resistance members killed	50–90 police/soldiers killed (Note: Including unspecified numbers of Formosan civilians serving with the Japanese at the time.)
- 2,000–4,000 civilians massacred by the Japanese

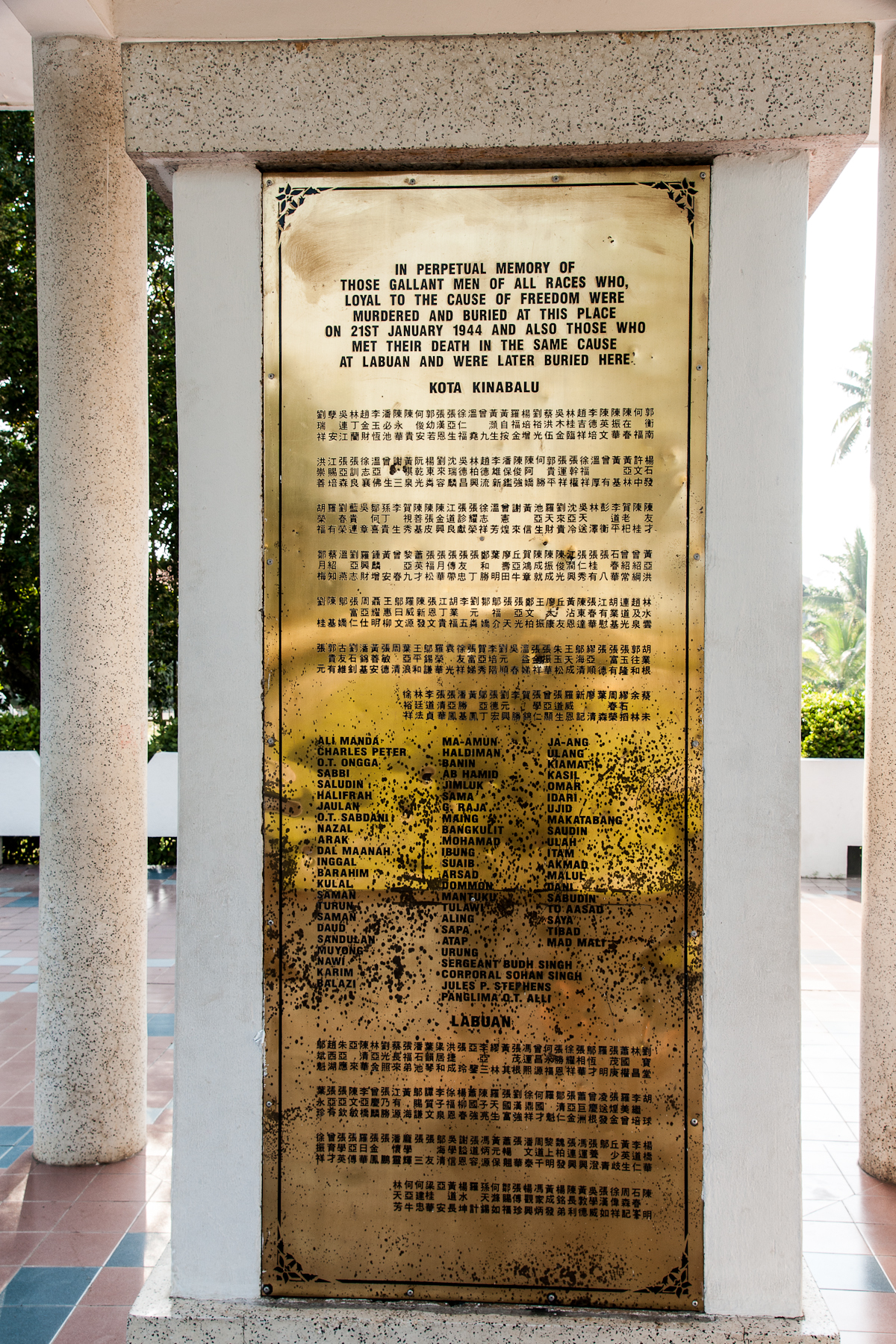
Plaque at the Petagas War Memorial with additional members executed after the revolt

The Jesselton revolt (also known as the Jesselton uprising or the Double Tenth Revolt/Incident) was a revolt by a resistance movement known as the Kinabalu Guerrillas, comprising local Chinese, indigenous peoples, Eurasian and Sikh Indians of Jesselton, North Borneo and led by Albert Kwok, against the Japanese occupying forces of North Borneo.

The movement succeeded in killing around 50–90 Japanese police and soldiers and temporarily took control of Jesselton (which after the war in 1946 would become the North Borneo and then later Sabah capital) and several neighbouring districts of Tuaran and Kota Belud. Owing to extremely limited arms supplies, however, the movement was forced to retreat to its hideout. The Japanese Kenpeitai then launched attacks against coastal settlements in western North Borneo to find the leader and members of the guerrilla force, with many innocent civilians suffering the various atrocities that have become synonymous with Japanese conquest in the Pacific War.

The leader of the revolt finally decided to surrender following Japanese threats to execute more civilians if the guerrillas did not turn themselves in. Following the arrest and subsequent execution of the rebel alliance, the Japanese returned to administer North Borneo until 1945 when the main Allied liberation mission arrived.

== Background ==
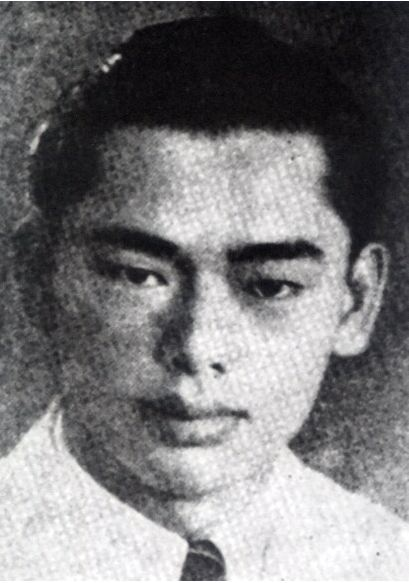
Albert Kwok, the main leader of Kinabalu Guerrillas.

Due to persistently harsh rules under the Japanese occupation, resistance against the Japanese developed, especially on the west coast of North Borneo, where a revolt was led by Albert Kwok with the members comprising mostly Chinese and some indigenous peoples. Kwok, a local Teochew Chinese from Kuching in neighbouring Sarawak, had previously been working with the China Red Cross and serving under the Kuomintang of Chiang Kai-shek, before returning to Borneo through Malaya in 1940. During his time in China, Kwok was also a student of the Seventh-day Adventist Mission School in Canton. He arrived in Jesselton on 15 May 1941 and started a medical practice treating piles.

In February 1942, Kwok wanted to establish contact with the Australians or Americans in eastern North Borneo, but he was unable to continue his trek by foot across the island jungle when he reached Pensiangan, which had a great number of Japanese troops. He needed to establish relations with the Allied movements, especially the United States Forces in the Philippines (USFIP), as they were the sole armed resistance movement in the region at the time which had a good supply of firearms. After he managed to establish contact with the American forces in the Philippines with the help of a fellow Chinese businessman named Lim Keng Fatt, a Muslim cleric (Imam) named Marajukim from Sulu who was part of the resistance movement in the Philippines approached Kwok in Jesselton where he departed to Tawi-Tawi for training. From there, they travelled further to Sulu and met Lieutenant Colonel Alejandro Suarez, learning of resistance movement operations in the Philippine archipelago.

In May 1943, Kwok returned to Jesselton greatly determined to liberate North Borneo. Upon arrival, he first contacted the Overseas Chinese Defence Association (OCDA), with whose help he acquired medical equipment and cash donations for the support of the resistance in Sulu. Once again, in June 1943, he travelled with Marajukim to the Philippines. Through the mediation of Suarez, he met with the representatives of the US army and was commissioned as a Lieutenant on 1 July 1943. Upon his second return to North Borneo, Kwok arrived with three pistols, a box of hand grenades, and a promise to be given more weapons. However, in the end, he could not induce the guerrillas in the Sulu Archipelago to send more firearms, and he was forced to launch a revolt with limited supplies. A resistance group under his leadership was then established on 21 September 1943, with the group calling itself the Chinese National Salvation Association (CNSA), a branch of the OCDA. With collaboration between the Chinese and indigenous peoples, the group was subsequently known as the Kinabalu Guerrillas Defence Force.

== Uprising ==
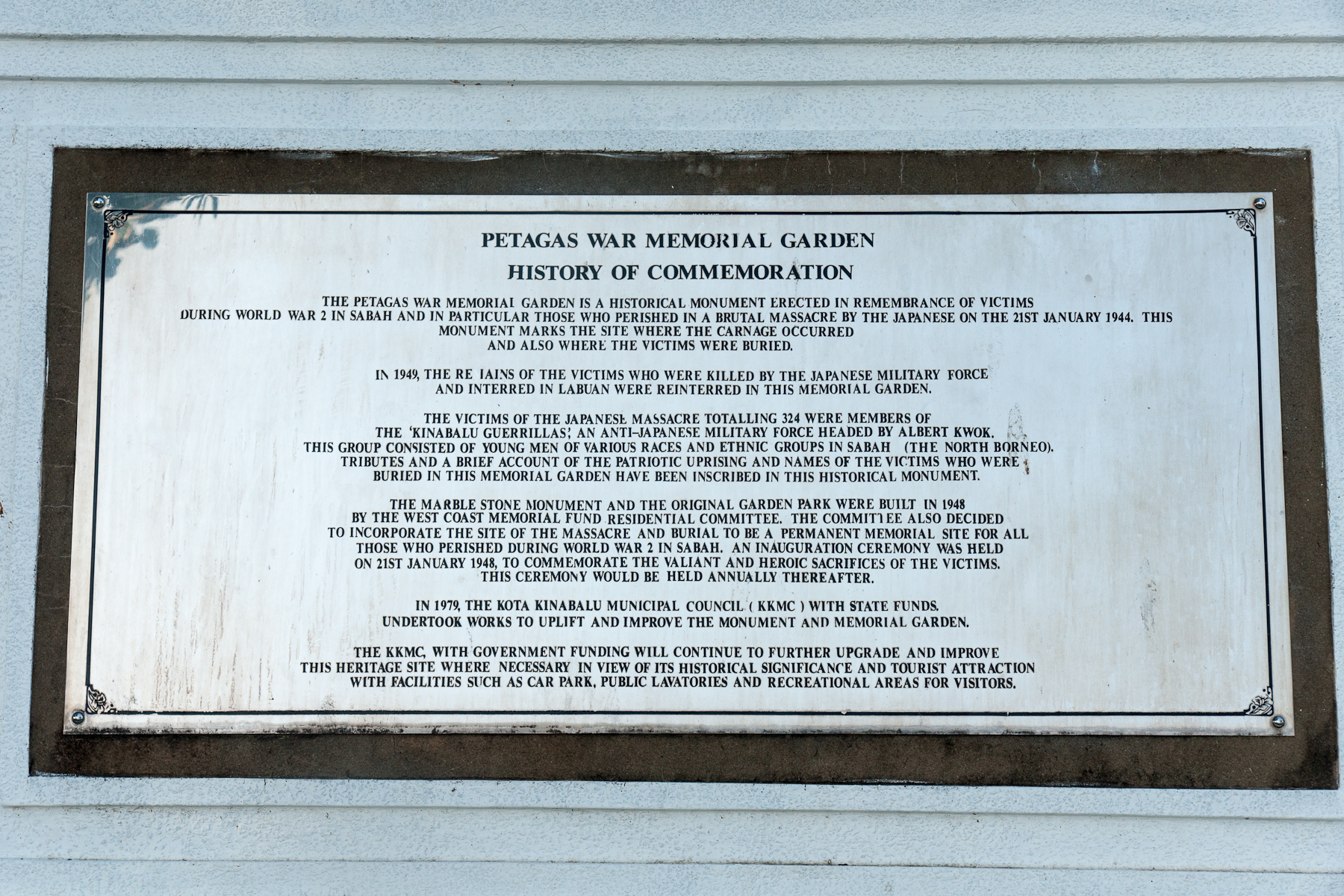
A plate commemorating the 324 fallen resistance members as well as victims of Japanese massacre in Petagas.

As the date of execution for a pending Japanese decree to seize any in opposition to the Japanese administration loomed closer, the resistance group was forced to launch their revolt ahead of schedule. With many of his members armed with only melee weapons such as parang, spear and kris, the movement launched their attack from 9 October 1943 and temporarily retook Jesselton, Tuaran, and Kota Belud from the Japanese, leaving around 50–90 casualties on the Japanese side.

In the combined land and sea attack on the Japanese, most inhabitants of the islands around the coastal areas contributed ships to the movement. Native Bajau-Suluk leaders such as Panglima Ali (Sulug Island) who became the leader of the resistance for the islanders along with other Village Headmen such as Jemalul (Mantanani Islands), Orang Tua Arshad (Udar Island), and Saruddin (Dinawan Island) contributed to the revolt mostly through attacks from the sea. Both Jemalul and Saruddin volunteered themselves from the Philippines to lead the Binadans (Bajau Bannaran) of Mantanani and the Dinawan Islands.

From land, the revolt was supported by native Dusun-Murut leaders such as Musah originated from Kampong Narupot Bingkor representing the Dusun of Gana community and Duallis for the Murut, as well as members of the Indian Imperial Police led by Constable Subedar Dewa Singh, and administration and police members of the former colonial authorities of North Borneo, mostly serving under the aegis of the North Borneo Volunteer Force (NBVF) led by Jules Stephens and Charles Peter, as well as Sergeant Bud Singh and Corporal Sohan Singh.

After the successful revolt, the resistance movement under OCDA and NBVF jointly hoisted the flag of the Republic of China and the Union Jack on 10 October 1943. Most of the members of the OCDA were loyal to the Republic of China while the NBVF remained loyal to the United Kingdom, although the NBVF was not even recognised by the British government.

With Imperial Japanese reinforcements from Kuching en route to suppress the rebellion, however, Kwok, along with other members of the resistance, were forced to retreat to their hideout. The OCDA celebrated the birthday of Sun Yat-sen, the founder of the Kuomintang and subsequently the Republic of China, by hoisting the national flag again and singing the national anthem of the Republic of China on 12 November 1943.

== Aftermath and legacy ==
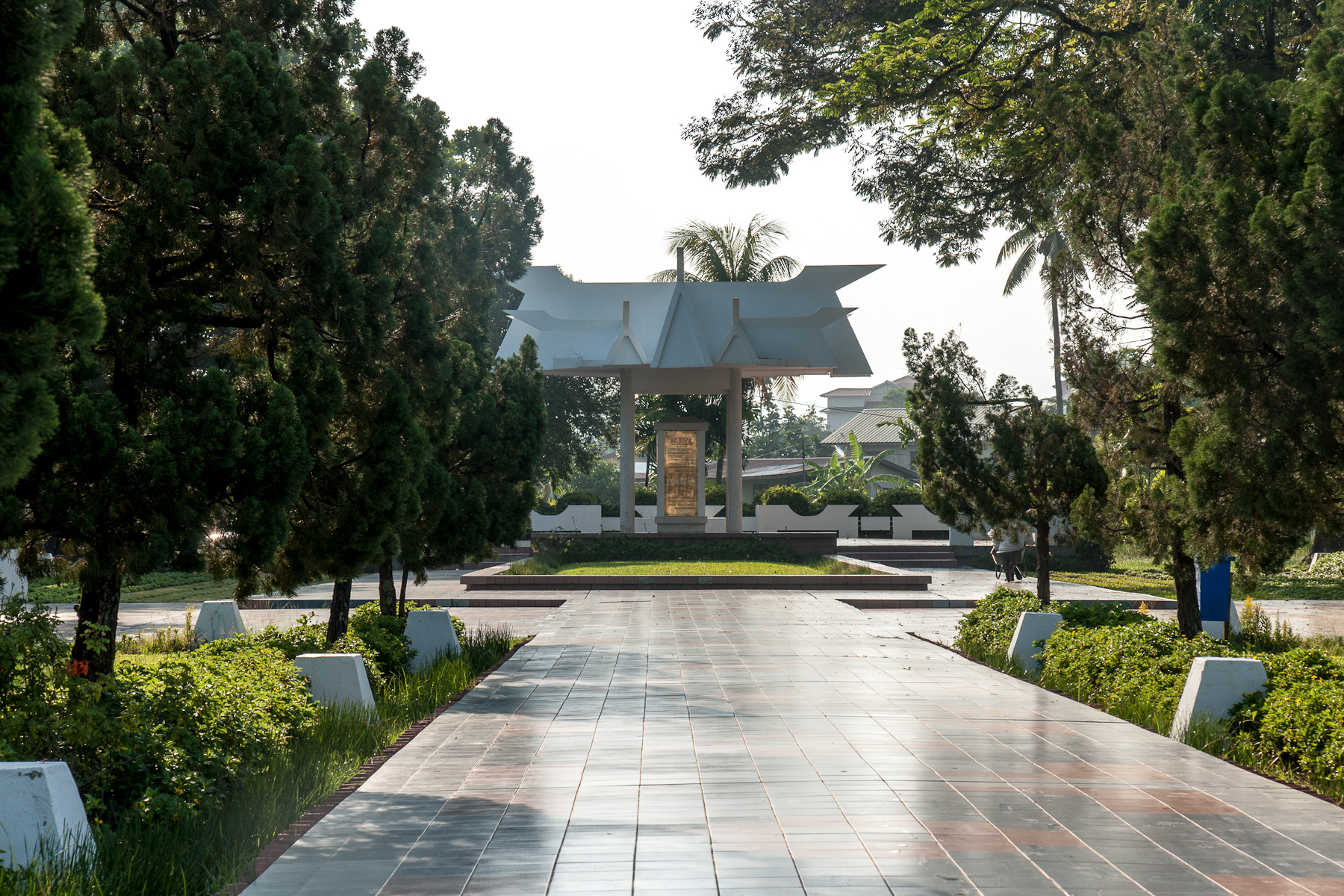
The Petagas War Memorial built on the site of execution to honour the sacrifices of Kinabalu Guerrillas.

Following the arrival of Japanese reinforcements, the Japanese authorities subsequently launched a ruthless counter-offensive by bombing coastal settlements from Kota Belud to Membakut and by machine-gunning the North Borneo population. Almost every village in the area was burnt down, with around 2,000–4,000 innocent civilians executed, mostly belonging to the Bajau and Suluk civilian population. After threatening to kill more civilians if the leaders of the uprising did not turn themselves in, Kwok finally surrendered under duress, along with several of his top officers. In all, Kwok and some 175 people who for the most part had nothing to do with the uprising were executed by the Japanese on 21 January 1944 in Petagas, Putatan.

After the war, the International Military Tribunal for the Far East (IMTFE) set up in 1946 to prosecute the many Japanese war crimes concluded that during the resistance movement led by the Chinese and indigenous peoples in North Borneo, the Kenpeitai had been involved in a reign of terror, arresting, torturing, and massacring hundreds of Chinese rebels while systematically exterminating the coastal population of Suluk people. The sacrifice of the movement was honoured with a memorial in Petagas, the Petagas War Memorial, today just east of the Kota Kinabalu International Airport.
