= Albert Kwok =

Borneo resistance fighter in World War II

Albert Kwok Fen Nam
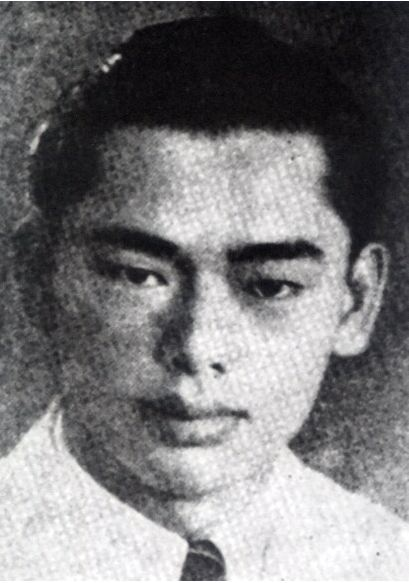
- Born: 1921; Kuching, Sarawak
- Died: 21 January 1944 (aged 22–23) Petagas, Putatan, Jeselton
- Cause of death: Beheaded
- Service years: 1943-1944
- Rank: Liutenant
- Commands: Kinabalu Guerillas Defense Force
- Conflicts: Jesselton revolt
- Education: Seventh-day Adventist Mission School

Albert Kwok, with the full name Albert Kwok Fen Nam (Chinese: 郭衡南; pinyin: Guō Héngnán; 1921 in Kuching, Sarawak – 21 January 1944 in Petagas, Putatan, Penampang, Sabah) was a leader of a resistance fighter known as the "Kinabalu Guerrillas" during the Japanese occupation of Borneo. He is regarded as the initiator of the so-called "Double Tenth Revolt" from 10 October 1943.

== Early life ==
Albert Kwok was born in 1921 in Kuching, Sarawak. His father was a dentist. In the late 1930s, he lived temporarily in China, where he learned the methods of the traditional Chinese medicine. He practised in Nanjing, Hankou and Canton while serving in the Kuomintang. Another source said that Kwok earned medical skills to treat haemorrhoids in Penang Straits Settlements. He returned to Borneo in 1940.

A 19-year-old Kwok moved to Jesselton on 15 May 1941 as a doctor to work. His practice was very successful although he had to treat his patients with a limited supply as the stock of drugs began to decline in the beginning years of World War II. His decision to defend himself against the occupying forces became more clear when the Japanese circulated a decree on 13 June 1942 with the following text:

Let the Chinese not forget that a single decision of the Japanese Supreme command is sufficient in order for them to be seized and killed.

== Struggle for liberation ==
=== Foundation of the "Kinabalu Guerrillas" ===
When the Japanese arrived to Jesselton in 1943, a close friend of Kwok who was a Chinese businessman known as Lim Keng Fatt was already in contact with the liaison of the Philippine guerrillas, an Imam from Sulu by the name of Marajukim. Kwok travelled with the Imam to Sulu and learned the activities of the resistance movement under the command of Filipino Lieutenant Colonel Alejandro Suarez there.

In May 1943, Kwok returned to Jesselton with a high determination to liberate North Borneo. Once he arrived there, he first contacted the "Oversea Chinese Defence Association", with whose help he acquired medical equipment and cash donations for the support of the resistance in Sulu. Once again, in June 1943, he travelled with Imam Marajukim to the Philippines. Through the mediation of Suarez, he met with the representatives of the US army and was appointed Lieutenant on 1 July 1943.

Back in North Borneo, he started from 21 September 1943 with the creation of a separate group of resistance fighters under his leadership. He called the movement under the name of the "Kinabalu Guerrillas" or also known as the "Kinabalu Guerrillas Defence Force".

The senior management of his resistance group consisted of:

- Hiew Syn Yong – An Assistant District Officer; one of the three commanders of the resistance fighters of Jesselton.
- Charles Peter – Formerly a senior police officer in Jesselton; the second of the three commanders.
- Subedar Dewa Singh - a former colleague of Charles Peter from the police service and the third of the three commanders.
- Kong Tze Phui – Commanded the Menggatal area.
- Jules Stephens – An aide with overall organisation responsibility.

=== "Double Tenth Revolt" ===
While Kwok was tasked to further develop his resistance group, he managed to know the plans of the Japanese-based from intelligence gatherings; according to which 2,000 young Chinese men would be forced to military service by the Japanese army, along with young Chinese women who would be used for the Japanese army comfort women. Kwok at the time only had about 100 guerrilla fighters for his resistance group, and could, moreover, expect a further 200 fighters from various indigenous ethnic groups of North Borneo.

On the eve of 10 October 1943 prior to the Chinese National Day, Kwok decided to begin their attack called as the "Double Tenth Revolt" with an estimate of 300 guerrilla fighters. The attack resulted in more than 60 Japanese troops killed mainly by parang, bujak and kris attack. Following the success, Kwok managed to temporarily take over control of Tuaran, Menggatal and Jesselton. However, three days later Japanese reinforcements arrived from Kuching, and because the guerrillas were ill-equipped they were forced to retreat into the hills of Menggatal. Fighting continued for more than two-months with the Japanese finally deciding to change their tactic by threatening to execute 400 civilians in Shantung Valley if the group did not surrender.

== Execution in Petagas ==
Kwok along with several of the movement leaders decided to surrender and was detained by the Japanese shortly afterward. He was first moved to a prison in Batu Tiga and then, along with 175 others who for the most part had nothing to do with the uprising was subjected to execution order by the Japanese on 21 January 1944 in Petagas. Kwok together with four other leaders – Charles Peter, Tsen Tsau Kong, Kong Tze Phui, and Li Tet Phui – were executed with a beheading by katana, while the others were killed using machine guns or bayonets.

== Acknowledgement ==
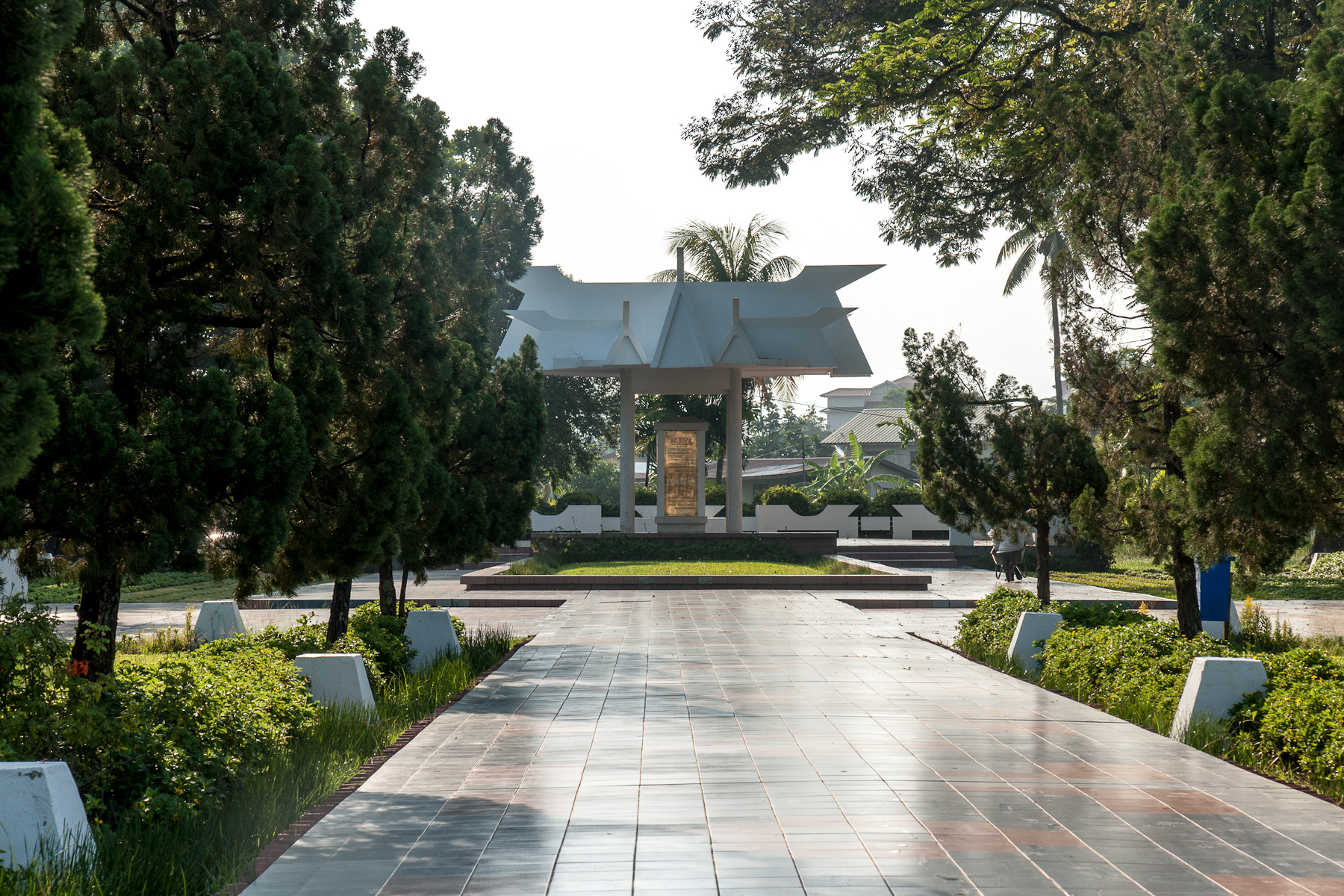
Petagas War Memorial.

The "Petagas War Memorial" in Putatan was then built as a memorial for Albert Kwok along with other innocent victims of Japanese executions.
