= Mantanani Islands =

Group of three islands off the north-west coast of Sabah, Malaysia

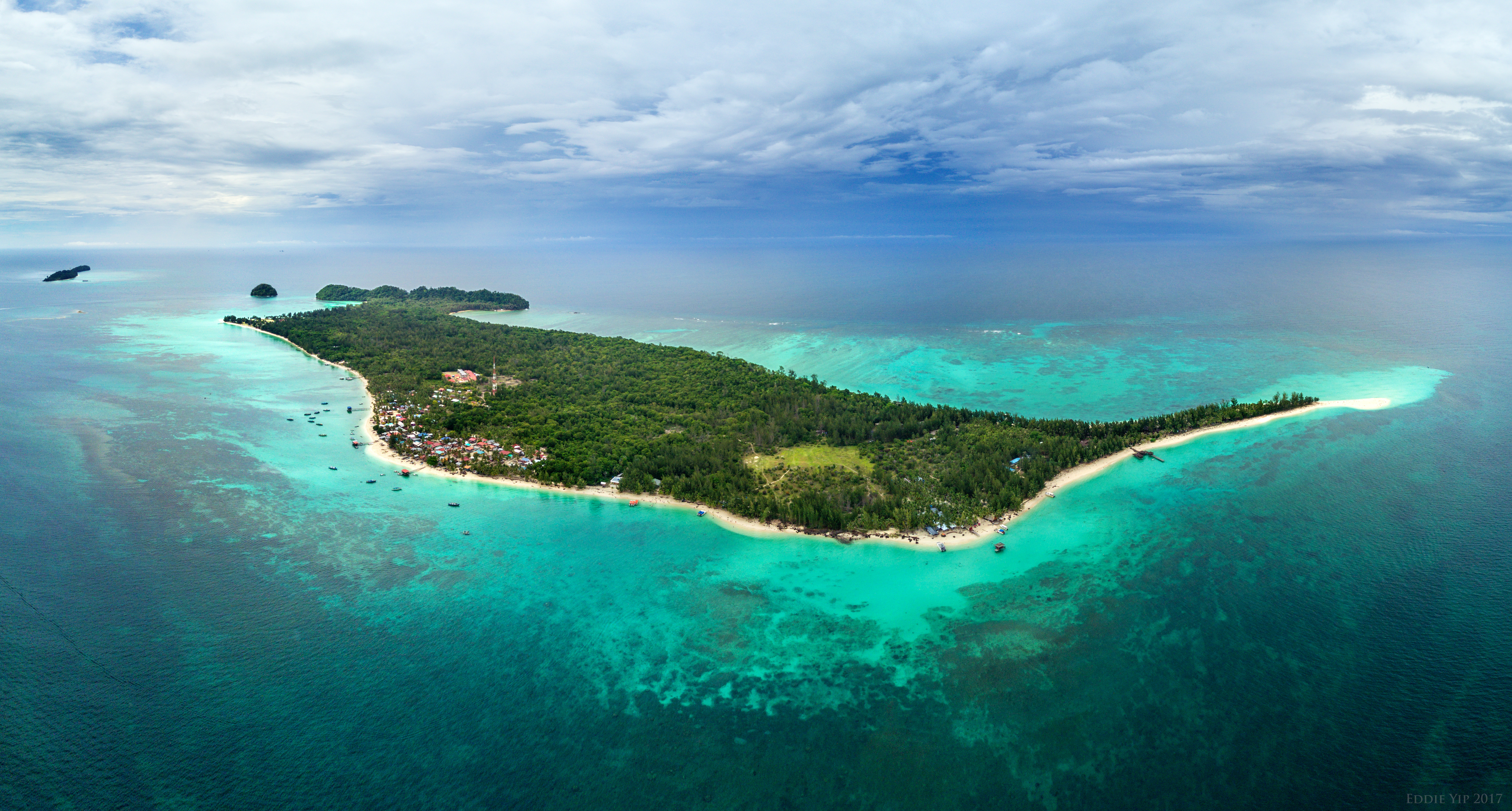
- Mantanani Besar
- Interactive map of Mantanani Islands

Geography
- Coordinates: 6°42′30″N 116°20′45″E

Administration
- Malaysia
- State: Sabah
- Division: Kudat
- District: Kota Belud

The Mantanani Islands (Malay: Pulau Mantanani) are a group of three islands off the north-west coast of the state of Sabah, Malaysia, opposite the town of Kota Belud, in northern Borneo. The largest island is Mantanani Besar; the other two are Mantanani Kecil and Lungisan. It is a popular site for recreational diving and is known for its dugongs.

The name of the island is a compound of Ubian word "manta" (blanket) and "Nani" (the name of a mighty man who fought the enemies that owned the blanket).

== Birdwatching ==
For birdwatchers, the Mantanani Islands are great for seeing birds that usually nest on islands, because of their relative lack of terrestrial predators, and are rarely or unpredictably seen on the mainland. There are several trails through the centre of the Mantanani Besar island in addition to open beaches along the coasts where birds can be spotted. Mantanani Besar is the only place in Malaysia to see the Mantanani scops owl. The islands are also home to four breeding pigeon species that include the pied imperial pigeon, grey imperial pigeon, pink-necked green pigeon and metallic pigeon. The Nicobar pigeon and black-naped fruit dove visit the island occasionally from the mainland. Emerald doves can also be seen on the island. Mantanani Besar is also home to the Philippine megapode, which thrive in the coastal forests. Three species of sunbird have been recorded on the islands; the brown-throated sunbird, the red-throated sunbird and the olive-backed sunbird. The blue-naped parrot is locally extinct. Lungisan Island has a nesting cave colony of Germain's swiftlets and is an important roost for three species of frigatebirds. Other seabirds that can be seen around the islands is the brown booby and the black-naped tern.

== Transportation ==
The islands are accessible by a one-hour speedboat trip from Kuala Abai jetty, Kota Belud, 80 km north-east of Kota Kinabalu, the capital of Sabah. Sometimes the islands can be inaccessible to tourists due to stormy weather. Mantanani Besar contains a number of small resorts, catering mainly to scuba divers, and Mantanani Kechil has a small dive lodge.

== See also ==
- List of islands of Malaysia
