= Hadji Kamlon =

Tausug datu in the Philippines

- هَجِّ كَمْلُنْ
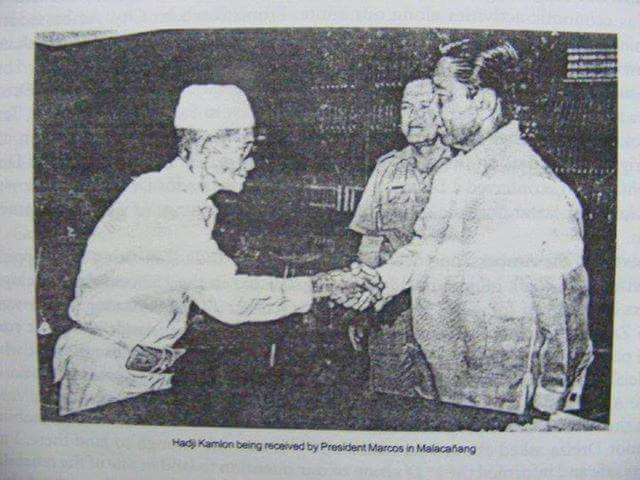
- President Ferdinand Marcos shakes hands with Kamlon after the latter's release.
- Born: Luuk, Sulu
- Other names: Maas Kamlon
- Organization: Sultanate of Sulu and North Borneo
- Spouse: Adjuria
- Father: Hadji Angsa

Datu Hadji Kamlon, also known as Maas Kamlon, was a Tausūg who fought during World War II, and afterwards, staged his own uprising against the Philippine government under Presidents Elpidio Quirino and Ramon Magsaysay. He is regarded as a folk hero among the Tausūg.

== Personal life ==
His father's name is Hadji Angsa while his wife's name is Adjuria. Kamlon did not have more wives because he said that he was contented with one.

Kamlon was also a peaceful farmer before World War II. After the war, he turned to banditry.

== Rebellion ==
Before the rebellion, he was known to the Philippine government as a "perennial troublemaker", having surrendered to the authorities on 1947 only to start an uprising in 1948. He had good relations and have high regard to his fellow unsung Tausug hero at that time, the Sayyid Sharif Captain Kalingalan Caluang.

In 1948, starting with a core group of 25 members, Kamlon launched a rebellion to clear the issue of land reform, overthrow the Philippine government, and assert the sovereignty of the Sultanate of Sulu and North Borneo over the Tausūg. Eventually, with his anti-Filipino campaign gaining traction, Kamlon's following grew to around 100 members. Armed mainly with M1918 Browning Automatic Rifles and a variety of Japanese rifles from the war, the group became known for wiping out the 7th Infantry Battalion, the Korean War veteran unit called Nenita. The gravity of Kamlon's threat shook the newly independent republic as it simultaneously dealt with other internal threats such as the communist movement Hukbalahap. Meanwhile, the Philippine government tried to sully Kamlon's name by branding him as a bandit, criminal, and rebel, among others, to blunt his image and reputation among the people.

=== Temporary peace and resumption of conflict ===
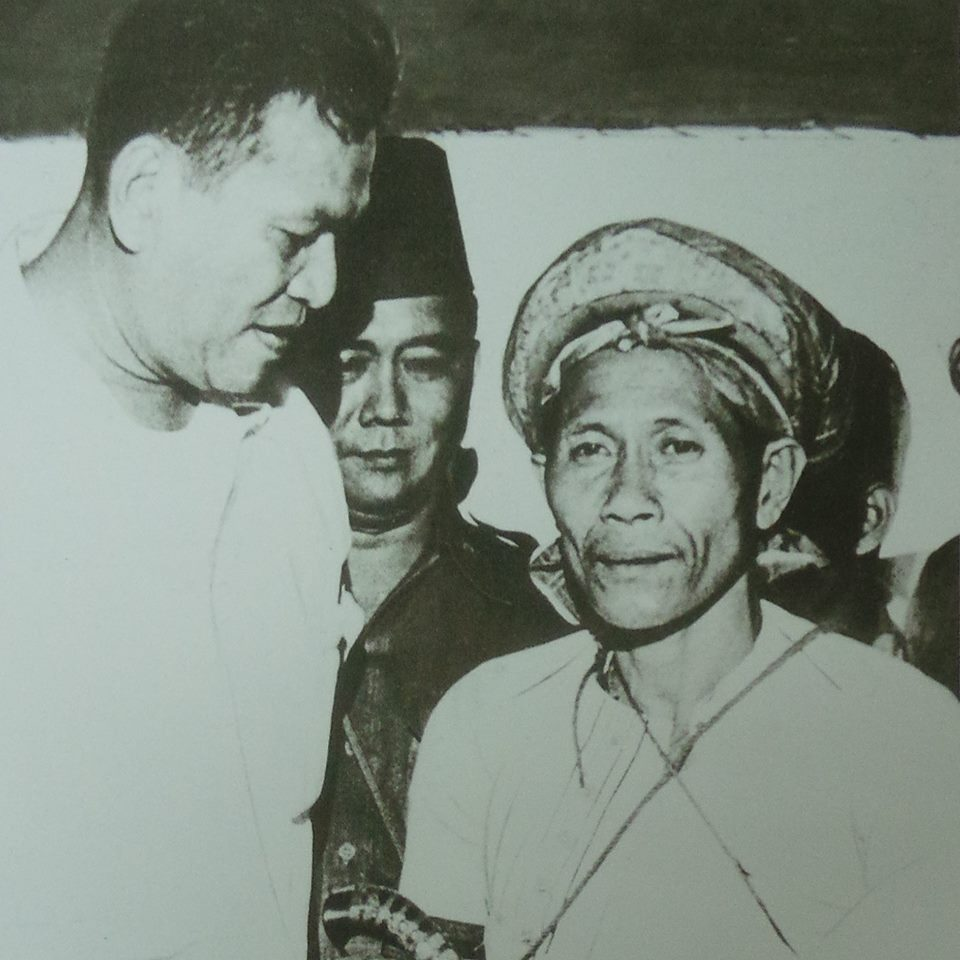
After his surrender, Kamlon meets with President Ramon Magsaysay.

In July 1952, more than 5,000 troops supported by tanks, aircraft, and naval units were mobilized to flush out Kamlon, this time led by then Defense Secretary Ramon Magsaysay. On July 31 of the same year, Kamlon showed up at Lahing-Lahing beach where he surrendered, not because of the ensuing offensive, but in response to Magsaysay's secret meeting with him in Sulu. By this time, Kamlon had some 300 warriors with him, and was considered the second largest threat to the Philippines next to the Hukbalahap.

However, observers were quick to judge Kamlon's actions as a farce, likely to serve as relief from the fighting. President Elpidio Quirino himself dispelled any claims that he shook hands with Kamlon as a result of this surrender. This doubt would be justified when in August 1952, a week after his surrender, Kamlon returned to continue his rebellion, and the Filipino troops were back in Sulu to fight against his forces. The resulting battle caused 20 casualties on Kamlon's side.

On August 13, 1952, Kamlon's force attacked Jolo. He has been successful.

A few months later, on November 9, Kamlon once again surrendered. However it was only on November 12 that he would formally surrender to Justice Secretary Oscar Castelo who had been designated by the President as his personal representative to accept the surrender in the office of the Director of Prisons at Muntinlupa, Rizal. Castelo reassured Kamlon that the government would see to it that he would be brought before the courts as soon as possible, perhaps within two weeks, so that the charges pending against him would be resolved at a fair trial as promised to him by the President. The Moro outlaw arrived in Manila the previous day, accompanied by Col. Agustin Marking who effected his surrender. He will be under the custody of the Director of Prisons while awaiting trial.

With 23 of his men, they were convicted and sentenced to life imprisonment. It would not take long before Kamlon was out again to resume his rebellion. This cycle would continue till 1955.

He was then brought to Muntinlupa Prison afterwards after a trial on November 29 but was again granted executive clemency by President Quirino and paroled with 23 of his men, and 5,000 hectares of public land on Tawi-Tawi were set aside for him and his followers. However Kamlon and his men did not settle on Tawi-Tawi for various reasons.

On August 11, 1953, there was a battle between Kamlon's forces and Philippine Armed Forces in the eastern part of Sulu. The government forces were successful.

On January 4, 1955, Kamlon's forces attacked Kibugtongan, robbing homes, kidnapping civilians and destroyed the bridge at Motain. On the 5th, a small PC detachment moved by truck and found Kamlon's forces slowly slogging on muddy roads. They eventually clashed at Mulita Bridge which was won by government forces. Two days later on the 7th, 12 of Kamlon's forces surrendered.

From another account in August 1955, Kamlon and 40 of his followers routed an entire platoon of government troops in Sulu, killing 18 and wounding 19 others. This was the "largest casualty figure in one engagement suffered by government troops" in pursuit of Kamlon. His group incurred only 1 death and 5 wounded, according to the news report.

On September 24, 1955, when Kamlon delivered his unconditional surrender after a battle that occurred on Tandu Panuan, Sulu for the 4th time against the 2nd Infantry Division, Sulu Air Task Group (SATAG, composed of 6th and 7th Fighter Squadrons), and a gunboat of the Philippine Navy that cost him 190 of his men killed, 48 wounded and 82 captured. The entire seven-year campaign cost the government ₱185 million (US$985 million in 2019 figures).

== Imprisonment ==
Kamlon's initial conviction was upheld and he was sentenced to life imprisonment, a condition Kamlon himself contested, claiming that his surrender was not entirely unconditional because there was "a promise of a parole". However, the Philippine government countered with the justification that Kamlon was not promised anything beyond his partial pardon. Since he had violated the conditions of his pardon, he was disqualified. The conditions included a monthly report from Kamlon to the Philippine Constabulary, his assistance to the surrender of rebels and firearms in the Sulu area, and his permission to be regularly visited by an authority from the Philippine government. Among those who worked for his release was Nur Misuari, later chairman of the Moro National Liberation Front. For those who survived the uprising, and those who would follow the path of Moro rebellion, the aging Kamlon was viewed as a pioneer in fighting for independence and liberty. He was finally granted a pardon by President Ferdinand Marcos.

== Popular culture ==
Kamlon was portrayed by Ramon Revilla in the 1981 film Kamlon. The film was an entry in the 1981 Metro Manila Film Festival.

== See also ==
- Kamlon rebellion
- Jabidah massacre
- Moro conflict
