= Kamlon rebellion =

1948–1955 Moro rebellion in the Philippines

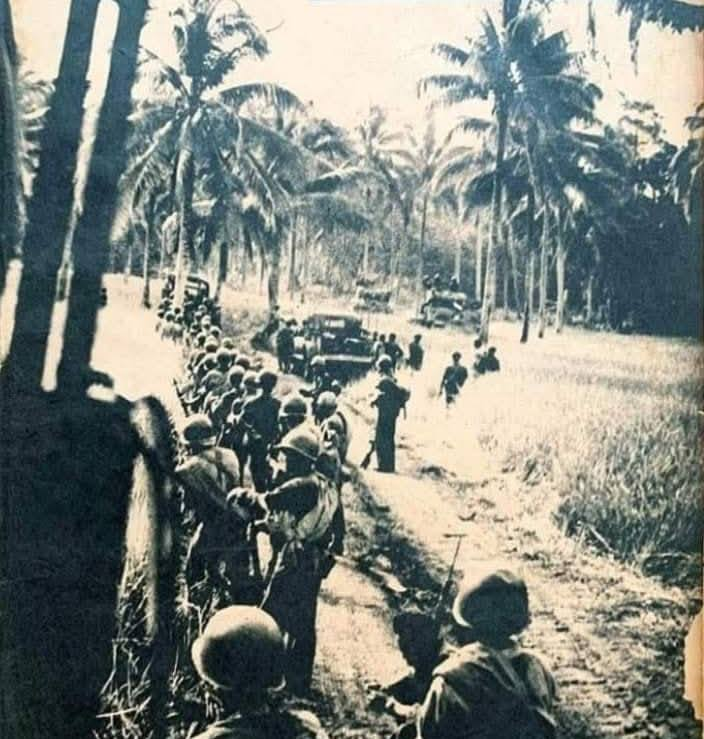
- Government forces advance in Jolo, 1952
Date	1948–1955
Location	Sulu, Philippines
Result	First phase: Rebellion temporarily halts Second phase: Philippine government victory: End of the rebellion; Final surrender of Hadji Kamlon in 1955

Belligerents
Republic of the Philippines Supported by: United States of America	Tausūg rebels

Commanders and leaders
(Philippines) Elpidio Quirino (Philippines) Ramon Magsaysay (United States) Edward Lansdale	Hadji Kamlon

Strength
5,000 to 10,000	100 to 300

Casualties and losses
(Philippines) Heavy military and economic casualties >Elite Korean war unit "Nenita" wiped out (with 1 survivor remaining) >1 Philippine Constabulary command unit wiped out	at least 190 killed at least 82 captured at least 48 wounded

The Kamlon rebellion was a rebellion led by Tausūg datu Hadji Kamlon against the Philippine government. It started in 1948 during the presidency of Elpidio Quirino and ended in 1955 during the presidency of Ramon Magsaysay.

== Rebellion ==
In 1948, starting with a core group of 25 members, Hadji Kamlon launched a rebellion to clear the issue of land reform, overthrow the Philippine government, and assert the sovereignty of the Sultanate of Sulu and North Borneo over the Tausūg. Eventually, with his anti-Filipino campaign gaining traction, Kamlon's following grew to around 100 members. Armed mainly with M1918 Browning automatic rifles and a variety of Japanese rifles from the war, the group became known for wiping out the 7th Infantry Battalion, the Korean War veteran unit called Nenita. The gravity of Kamlon's threat shook the newly independent republic as it simultaneously dealt with other internal threats such as the communist Hukbalahap rebellion. Meanwhile, the Philippine government tried to sully Kamlon's name by branding him as a bandit, criminal, and rebel, among others, to blunt his image and reputation among the people.

=== Temporary peace and resumption of conflict ===
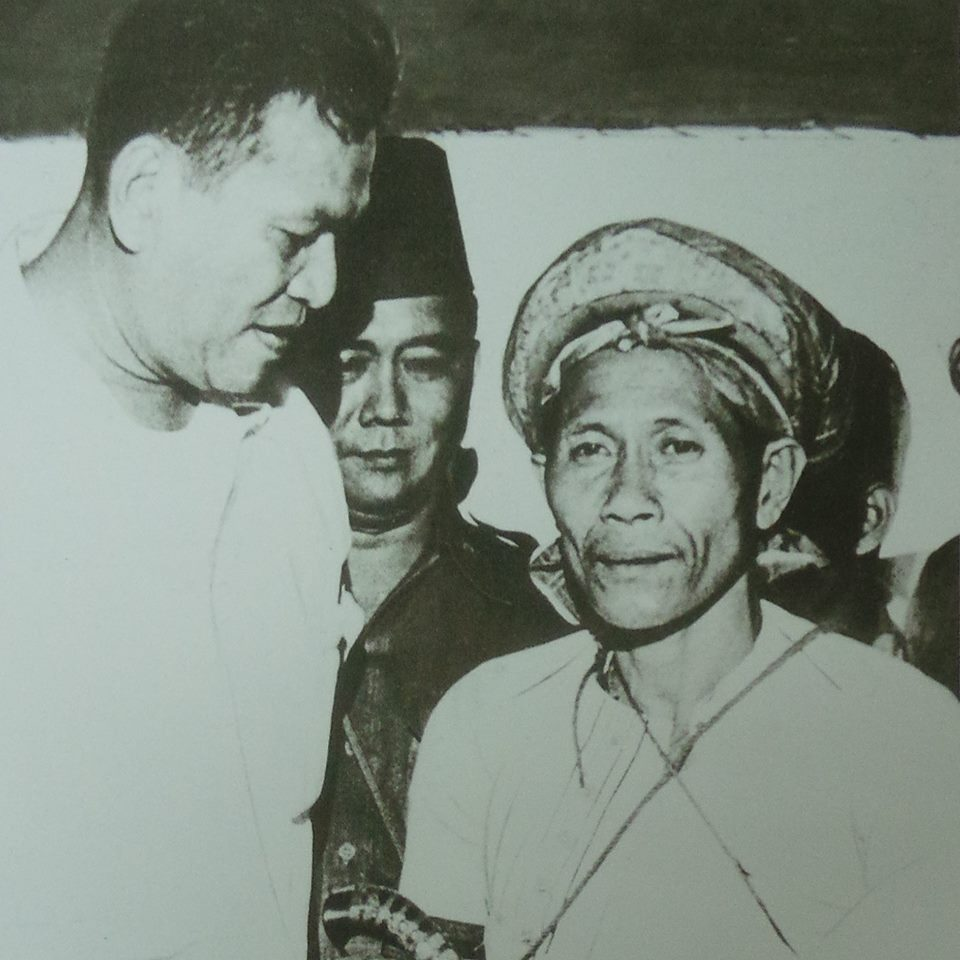
After his surrender, Kamlon meets with President Ramon Magsaysay.

In July 1952, more than 5,000 troops supported by tanks, aircraft, and naval units were mobilized to flush out Kamlon, this time led by then Defense Secretary Ramon Magsaysay. On July 31 of the same year, Kamlon showed up at Lahing-Lahing beach where he surrendered, not because of the ensuing offensive, but in response to Magsaysay's secret meeting with him in Sulu. By this time, Kamlon had some 300 warriors with him, and was considered the second largest threat to the Philippines next to the Hukbalahap.

However, observers were quick to judge Kamlon's actions as a farce, likely to serve as relief from the fighting. President Elpidio Quirino himself dispelled any claims that he shook hands with Kamlon as a result of this surrender. This doubt would be justified when in August 1952, a week after his surrender, Kamlon returned to continue his rebellion, and the Filipino troops were back in Sulu to fight against his forces. The resulting battle caused 20 casualties on Kamlon's side.

On August 13, 1952, Kamlon's forces successfully launched an assault on Jolo.

A few months later, on November 9, Kamlon once again surrendered. However it was only on November 12 that he would formally surrender to Justice Secretary Oscar Castelo who had been designated by the President as his personal representative to accept the surrender in the office of the director of prisons at Muntinlupa, Rizal. Castelo reassured Kamlon that the government would see to it that he would be brought before the courts as soon as possible, perhaps within two weeks, so that the charges pending against him would be resolved at a fair trial as promised to him by the President. The Moro outlaw arrived in Manila the previous day, accompanied by Colonel Agustin Marking who effected his surrender. He will be under the custody of the director of prisons while awaiting trial.

With 23 of his men, they were convicted and sentenced to life imprisonment. It would not take long before Kamlon was out again to resume his rebellion. This cycle would continue till 1955.

He was then brought to Muntinlupa Prison afterwards after a trial on November 29 but was again granted executive clemency by President Quirino and paroled with 23 of his men, and 5,000 hectares of public land in Tawi-Tawi were set aside for him and his followers. However, Kamlon and his men did not settle on Tawi-Tawi for various reasons.

On August 11, 1953, an engagement in the eastern region of Sulu between Kamlon's forces and the Philippine Armed Forces resulted in a government victory.

On January 4, 1955, Kamlon's forces attacked Kibugtongan, robbed homes, kidnapped civilians, and destroyed the bridge at Motain. On the 5th, a small PC detachment moved by truck and found Kamlon's forces slowly slogging on muddy roads. They eventually clashed at Mulita Bridge which was won by government forces. Two days later on the 7th, 12 of Kamlon's forces surrendered.

From another account in August 1955, Kamlon and 40 of his followers routed an entire platoon of government troops in Sulu, killing 18 and wounding 19 others. This was the "largest casualty figure in one engagement suffered by government troops" in pursuit of Kamlon. His group incurred only 1 death and 5 wounded, according to the news report.

On September 24, 1955, when Kamlon delivered his unconditional surrender after a battle that occurred on Tandu Panuan, Sulu for the 4th time against the 2nd Infantry Division, Sulu Air Task Group (SATAG, composed of 6th and 7th Fighter Squadrons), and a gunboat of the Philippine Navy that cost him 190 of his men killed, 48 wounded and 82 captured. The entire seven-year campaign cost the government ₱185 million (US$985 million in 2019 figures).
