= Pampanga in the Philippine Revolution =

Pampanga province during the Philippine Revolution

Province of Pampanga Provincia de la Pampanga Lalawígan ning Pampanga
- Motto: Siempre reconozco aún dueño "Steadfast in my master I remain"
- Anthem: Marcha Real "Royal March"
- Status: Province
- Capital: Bácolor
- Common languages: Spanish (official); Kapampangan (official)
- Religion: Roman Catholicism
- Demonyms: pampango -a (Spanish) kapampángan (Kapampangan)
- Government: Provincial Government; Autonomous vassal
- Gobernador Civil
  - 1895–1898: José Cánovas y Vallejo
- History
  - Kapampangan-Spanish Cooperation: December 11, 1571
  - Eighty Years War: 1568–1648
  - Maniago Rebellion: 1660
  - British invasion: September 24, 1762
  - Philippine Revolution: August 19, 1896
  - Spanish Retreat from Macabebe: August 1898
  - United States annexation: December 10, 1898
- Currency: Real de a ocho, peso fuerte
- Today part of: Province of Pampanga

Pampanga in the Philippine Revolution remained almost wholly loyal to Spanish suzerainty, with only few noble Kapampangan families defecting to the Katipunan. Kapampangan involvement in defending Spanish interests began when the Revolution broke out, with many freemen enlisting in Spanish forces. However, Tagalog rebels would eventually infiltrate the province and begin a campaign of terrorism. Once Spain lost the Battle of Manila Bay, Spanish forces in Pampanga retreated to Macabebe and awaited their return to Spain. Republican forces would raze and loot Kapampangan towns for their cooperation with Spanish forces. To avenge their losses, many Kapampangans would enlist with the Americans to defeat the Philippine Republic.

== Background ==
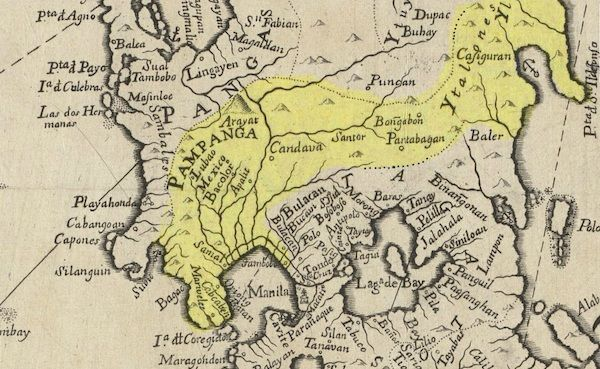
The Province of La Pampanga, c. 1625. Numerous partitions would shrink the province's boundaries.

The inhabitants of Pampanga cooperated closely with Spanish authorities, with Kapampangans forming the bulk of natives that enlisted in the Spanish army. Kapampangan troops fought alongside Spaniards in land battles for Formosa, Guam, and Cagayan, and in naval battles against the Dutch. British forces attempting to invade Bulacan from Manila suffered heavily from Kapampangan counteroffensives that pushed them back to Intramuros. In return, the Spanish allowed Kapampangans to join the Spanish peerage, study in Spanish universities both in Manila and in Spain, and join the Spanish army as officers.

As Kapampangans had cooperated closely with Spain, they found little merit in rebellion aside from a few instances. Land disputes, like those which José Rizal encountered, happened mostly in Tagalog regions. Kapampangans would settle quietly in Pampanga for years, until the Revolution began. Larkin notes that

During the fourteen years preceding the outbreak of hostilities, the budding nationalist movement drew little support from the Pampangans. The Spanish repressions of 1892 involved a small number of the native elite. Only a few dedicated families such as the Alejandrinos of Aráyat and the Jovens of Bácolor actively supported the Propagandists, and, in general, the problems of colonial policy and practice merited little attention in the province. (Larkin 1972, p 111).

== War ==
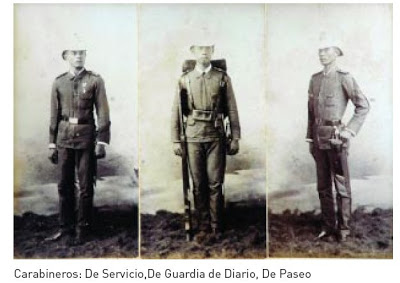
Kapampangan Carabineer Officers who served in the Royal Spanish Army. Many Kapampangans enlisted in the Spanish forces.

When the Revolution began out in and around Manila in August 1896, Governor-General Ramón Blanco declared martial law in eight provinces, including Pampanga and Tarlac. Just as their forefathers did before, Kapampangans enlisted en masse in the Spanish Army to fight the revolutionary forces. These forces consisted of volunteers, Voluntarios pampangos, and enlisted personnel coming from Kapampangan families of all classes. Many of the latter from Macabebe patrolled the Pampanga River and Candaba Swamp to prevent rebel forces from reaching Pampanga.

Through the rest of 1896 and all of 1897, Kapampangan forces cooperated with the Spanish and defeated the Katipunan in successive battles. Once the Pact of Biak na Bato had been signed in November 1897, however, Tagalog forces changed their strategy with regards to the province and the Kapampangan people. By August 1897, Larkin noted, Katipunero infiltrators from Bulacan province had established the first Katipunan chapter in Guagua town to sway the townsfolk to join the revolution, however, recruitment was few. In October, a Katipunero infiltrator escaped from Spanish guards who were trying to capture him during a religious festival. Kapampangan towns would thereafter organize local militia units to defend themselves under the command of Spanish Army officers to stop the revolutionary fevour in the province. Governor-General Camilo de Polavieja remarked that a "belt of fire" surrounded Pampanga for the Kapampangans had refused to join the Katipunan's military forces. For their fervor in fighting for Spain, Governor José Cánovas petitioned the governor-general to award all of Pampanga a title for service. Primo de Rivera remarked on the Kapampangans' loyalty to the Spanish cause.

In December, an attempted Katipunero attack on Candaba failed to the local militia's defense. Around the same time, Macabebe soldiers won a skirmish with Katipunan rebels near Mount Arayat. Katipunero terrorism in Pampanga, however, would continue as pressure mounted on the then few local councils in Pampanga to take direct action and intensify recruitment of Kapampangan militiamen. In March 1898, Katipunero infiltrators, all under the orders of General Francisco Macabulos, commander of revolutionary forces in Central Luzon, attempted to assassinate Don Martin Gosun, who kept to his home and evaded them. Later that month, a Dr. Santa María of Guagua and his family, and all other Spaniards of Guagua, were killed by Katipuneros. The local parish priest of Candaba, Fr. Urbano Vedoya would leave town on the same day for fear of Katipunan revenge for his parish's loyality to the Spanish crown.

Larkin notes that

Rebel strength continued to grow and to exert itself. In January the barrio people of Betis became alarmed because a group of Katipuneros from Santa Rita came to ask the whereabouts of a certain Don Martin Gosun, who in the meantime was staying at home "for security reasons." By March the rebel leader Francisco Macabulos y Soliman had organized local juntas in every town of Pampanga. About that time, Vicente Bravo together with Dr. Santa Maria and his family—and all Spaniards of Guagua—were murdered...(Larkin, 1972, p 116).

At the time of the Declaration of Independence on June 12, 1898, there was already a Pampanga detachment of the Revolutionary Army led by Maximino Hizon, made up of a mix of Tagalog volunteers and Kapampangan militias, few in number, and Republic-organized councils in the towns of the province to counter existing municipal councils of the Spanish government. Their growing numbers proved to be a threat to Kapampangan loyalty to Spain and to the province's rich and middle classes.

== Spanish capitulation ==
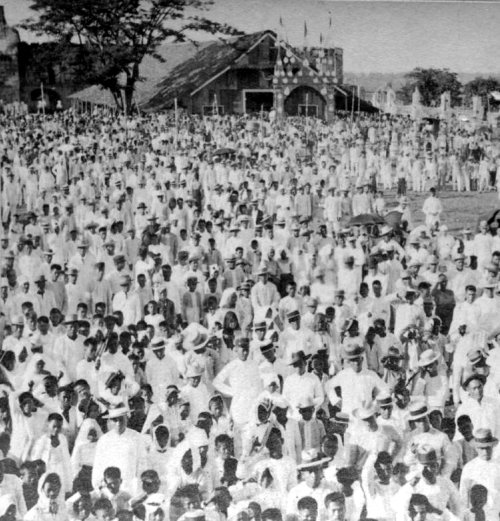
Kapampangans enlisting into the US Army. The Americans referred to them as Macabebes despite having come from all over Pampanga.

When American forces won in the Battle of Manila Bay, Spanish troops in Pampanga realized that the war had been lost and retreated to Macabebe. This town held the stragglers till Spanish forces completely withdrew from the Philippines. The rest of the province, however, quickly felt the Republic's wrath. Mabalacat and San Fernando saw their parish priests executed in front of Kapampangan parishioners. Republican soldiers razed and burned many establishments in revenge for supporting Spain. General José Alejandrino took command of the province and ordered forcible enlistment into the Republic's army. Puppet mayors demanded forced taxation and tribute to pay for the Republic's expenses. Lastly, Macabebe felt Antonio Luna's wrath for the latter had much of the town razed for letting the last stragglers remain there. Only Alejandrino's intervention prevented the town from total destruction.

Once American forces had reached Pampanga, many Kapampangans enlisted into the American army to avenge their losses. American sources describe them as the "Macabebe Scouts", despite coming from all over Pampanga. Notably, Kapampangan soldiers would capture Emilio Aguinaldo in Isabela and help American forces occupy the country.

== Aftermath ==
Fighting ruined the Kapampangan economy for many men were away to stop the rebellion. Agriculture and manufacture gave way to famine and depression. Prices collapsed, and land went unused. Looting and razing by Katipuneros also pushed many Kapampangans to poverty. Such conditions allowed a few who allied with the Katipunan to buy large swathes of land in the American period. These actions lead to the agrarian crisis and the Huk rebellion many decades later.

The war also ruined Kapampangan prestige, going from an autonomous vassal of the Spanish crown to a mere canton of the Philippine Republic. Puppet mayors enacted taxes and tribute to donate to the Philippine Republic. All these factors pushed many Kapampangans to enlist in the US Army, helping the new conquerors to pacify the rest of the archipelago.

Because of the war's destruction, the Americans would move the capital of Pampanga from Bácolor to San Fernando. The former would decline to a small, unimportant town, and would bear the brunt of lahar flow after Mount Pinatubo's eruption. Meanwhile, San Fernando went to become a premier city in Pampanga, hosting the provincial archdiocese, numerous government offices, and commercial development.

Lastly, Tagalog dominance after the Revolution paved the way for the eventual suppression of Kapampangan culture and language in the latter half of the 20th century. Kapampangans would be denounced as dugong aso (Kapampangan: dáyâng ásu) by Tagalogs for their role in fighting the revolution. Tagalog culture would eventually make inroads into Pampanga until after Mount Pinatubo's eruption, when Kapampangan economy and culture began a renaissance.

== The Angeles City miracle of October 1897 ==
The era of the Revolutionary War in Kapampangan lands, though, earned yet another chapter in the history of the long Catholic faith in the province, and in particular to the devotion to the legendary sacred image of Apung Mamacalulu in Angeles City, whose festival began in October 1897, one year after the beginning of the Revolution.

On October 25, 1897, just as the five-day novena was ongoing on the Holy Rosary Parish, a farmer by the name of Roman Payumu, a local resident of the city, had been arrested on suspicion of participation in the Katipunan's local chapter in the city or in the nearby towns, and was due to be executed near the corner church wall of the parish. He prayed to the Apung Mamacalulu for salvation from his executioners, a squad of Spanish Army infantrymen reinforced by Guardia Civil constables from Macabebe, after receiving confession from the church's assistant pastor, Fr. Vicente Lapus, and as the firing party carried him to the spot, he suddenly regained his strength, and escaped to a nearby sugar field, only to leave the same night after hiding from his captors who searched for him in nearby towns. Till the end of his life, he attributed his salvation to his devotion to the Apung Mamacalulu - it was that first year of the feast when he volunteered to be a part of the procession as a bearer of the image. Since then, his miraculous escape and the other miracles attributed to the image are marked on the final Friday of October, the feast day of the image.

== See also ==
- Philippine Revolution
- Kapampangan language
- Kapampangan people
- Pampanga
- Counterrevolution
