= China–Malaysia relations =

- China: Malaysia

Diplomatic mission
- Chinese Embassy, Kuala Lumpur: Malaysian Embassy, Beijing

Envoy
- Ambassador Ouyang Yujing: Ambassador Norman Muhamad

China–Malaysia relations
- Simplified Chinese: 中马关系
Transcriptions
Standard Mandarin
- Hanyu Pinyin: Zhōng mǎ guānxì

The People's Republic of China (PRC) and Malaysia established diplomatic relations in May 1974. The PRC has its embassy in Kuala Lumpur, and consulate-general offices in George Town, Kota Kinabalu, Kuching and Singapore. Malaysia maintains its embassy in Beijing, as well as consulate offices in Kunming, Guangzhou, Shanghai, Xi'an and Hong Kong. The two countries are also bounded by the historical presence of Chinese people in Malaysia, which is currently the second largest Chinese diaspora around the world. Both countries are claimants in the South China Sea dispute and in recent times has resulted in friction.

== History ==
=== Early contact ===
Kunlun or Malay sailors were known in China by the third century BC, and there is evidence that had begun to settle along East African coast by the first century CE. By the time of Roman Empire, there were permanent communities of Malayo-Polynesian speaking people on the coast of Malagasy, where they remain to this day.

Chinese records from the fifth and sixth centuries AD note that products were shipped in kunlun vessels, apparently referring to maritime Southeast Asia vessels. By the seventh century, the term kunlun refer specifically to coastal people of the Malay region. By the ninth century, in Yiqiejing yingyi (815), Hui-Lin note that kunlun bo (Malay ship) were arriving regularly at Gulf of Tonkin and along south eastern Chinese coast. As religion was quite a thing in China, kunlun was needed to refer specifically to coastal people of the Malay region, as trade grew between both countries, stuff started happening.

=== Chinese dynasties relations with Malay Archipelago sultanates ===
==== Ming alliance with Malacca Sultanate ====
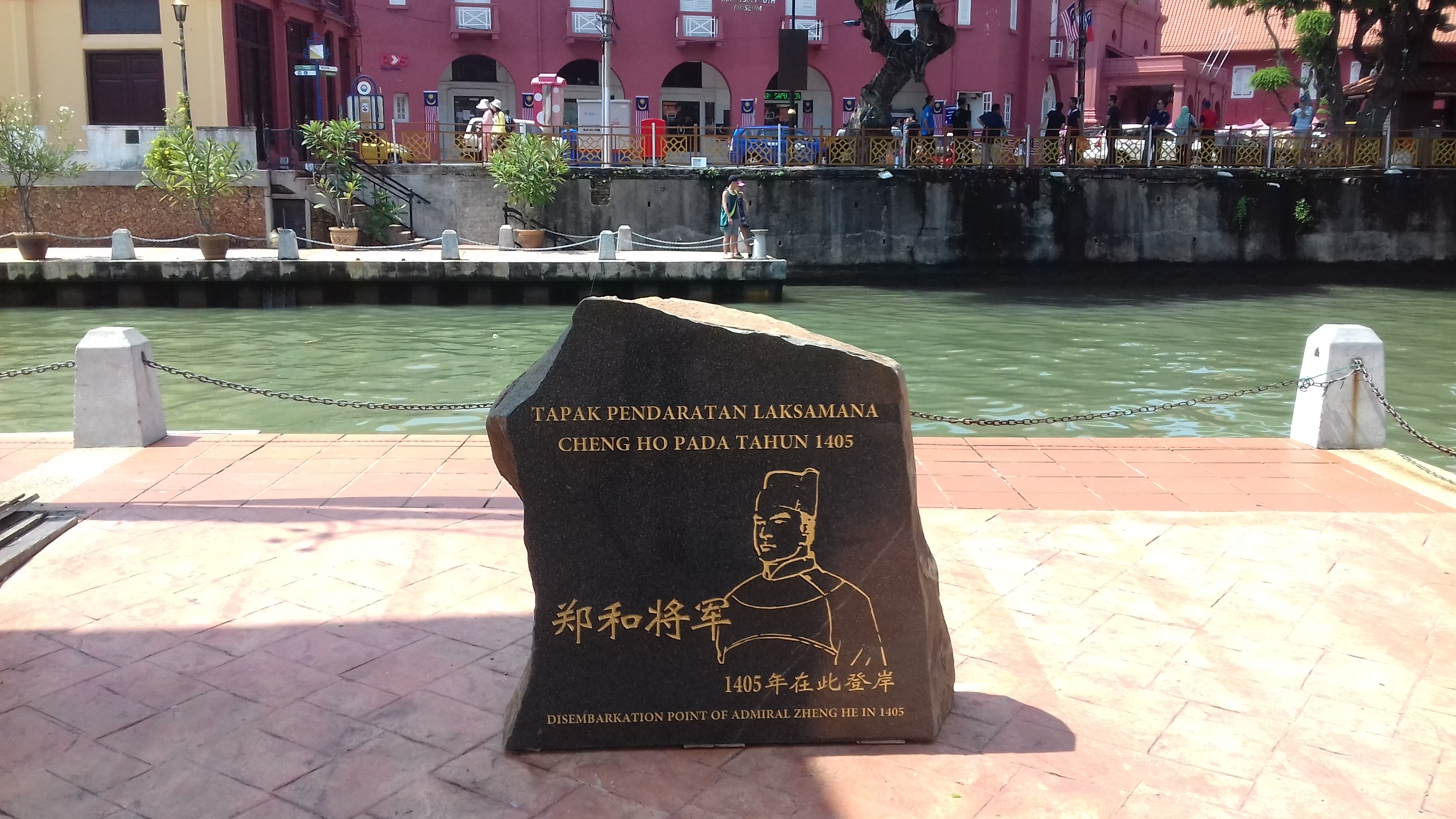
A memorial rock for the disembarkation point of Admiral Zheng He in 1405 at Malacca City.

The Sultanate of Malacca voluntarily established political and economic ties with Ming dynasty China, which protected Malacca against its enemies with military force, allowing the Muslim Sultanate to prosper. The Ming dynasty had played role in Malacca's external affair with Siam and Majapahit from conquering Malacca. At the foundation of Malacca, the native peoples were the peoples with Hinduism and Buddhism influence. According to the annals record, at the time Parameswara founded Malacca, the country had been few times attacked by the empire of Majapahit and the rivals from northern area of Malacca, Ayutthaya Kingdom. Being a strategist at that time, the ruler of Malacca decided to send his ambassadors to visit the Emperor of China, one of the superpower of the period, the Emperor of the Ming dynasty, and both agreed to become allies. Ever since the agreement between Malacca Empire and Ming Empire, the Ayutthaya Kingdom and Majapahit Empire never intended to attack Malacca. Later some records suggested that during the trade activities and arrival of the Chinese-Muslim admiral Zheng He, Islam has already rooted in the Malay people at that time. Parameswara himself had converted to Islam earlier and adopted an Islamic name, Sultan Iskandar Shah. The new religion spread quickly throughout his conversion and due to the busy tradings and cultural exchanges with Arabs and Indians who were themselves Moslem.

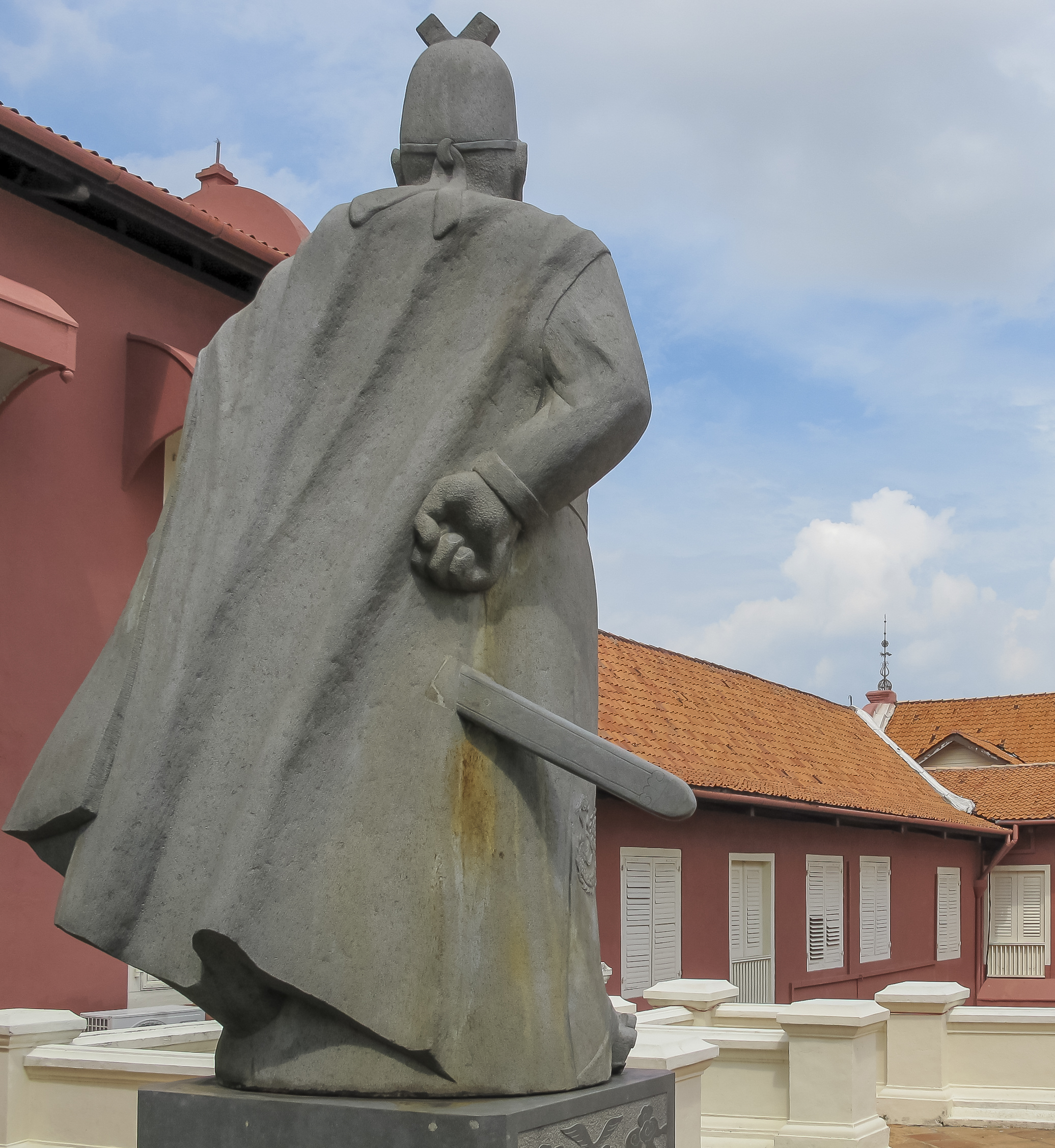
The Zheng He monument today (seen from the backside), marking his stopover at the city of Malacca.

Ming dynasty China warned Siam and the Majapahit against trying to conquer and attack the Malacca sultanate, placing the Malacca Sultanate under Chinese protection as a protectorate, and recognized the sovereignty of the ruler of Malacca. The Chinese strengthened several warehouses in Malacca. The Muslim Sultanate flourished due to the Chinese protection against the Thai and other powers who wanted to attack Malacca, while keeping strategic political ties with other Muslim countries at that time. Siam was also a tributary to China and had to obey China's orders not to attack. After Vietnam (Annam) destroyed Champa in the 1471 Vietnamese invasion of Champa, they proceeded to engage in hostilities with Malacca with the intent of conquest. The Chinese government sent a censor, Ch'en Chun, to Champa in 1474 to install the Champa King, but he discovered Vietnamese (Annamese) soldiers had taken over Champa and were blocking his entry. He proceeded to Malacca instead and its ruler sent back tribute to China. Malacca again sent envoys to China in 1481 to inform the Chinese that, while Malaccan envoys were returning to Malacca from China in 1469, the Vietnamese attacked the Malaccans, killing some of them while castrating the young and enslaving them. The Malaccans reported that Vietnam was in control of Champa and also sought to conquer Malacca, but the Malaccans were holding tight and wait for the diplomatic signal because they did not want to fight against another state that was a tributary to China without permission from the Chinese. They requested to confront the Vietnamese delegation to China which was in China at the time, but the Chinese informed them since the incident was years old, they could do nothing about it, and the Emperor sent a letter to the Vietnamese ruler reproaching him for the incident. The Chinese Emperor also ordered the Malaccans to raise soldiers and fight back with violent force if the Vietnamese attacked them again.

After the Portuguese invaded and destroyed the Malacca sultanate at the Capture of Malacca (1511), it established the Portuguese Malacca colony. The Chinese reacted with extreme anger at the Portuguese invasion of its ally and refused to accept a Portuguese embassy after the attack. The Chinese Imperial Government imprisoned and executed multiple Portuguese envoys after torturing them in Guangzhou. The Malaccans had informed the Chinese of the Portuguese seizure of Malacca, to which the Chinese responded with hostility toward the Portuguese. The Malaccans told the Chinese of the deception the Portuguese used, disguising plans for conquering territory as mere trading activities, and told of all the atrocities committed by the Portuguese. Due to the Malaccan Sultan lodging a complaint against the Portuguese invasion to the Chinese Emperor, the Portuguese were greeted with hostility from the Chinese when they arrived in China. The Sultan's complaint caused "a great deal of trouble" to Portuguese in China. The Chinese were very "unwelcoming" to the Portuguese. The Malaccan Sultan, based in Bintan after fleeing Malacca, sent a message to the Chinese, which combined with Portuguese banditry and violent activity in China, led the Chinese authorities to execute 23 Portuguese and torture the rest of them in jails. After the Portuguese set up posts for trading in China and committed piratical activities and raids in China, the Chinese responded with the complete extermination of the Portuguese in Ningbo and Quanzhou.

The Chinese had sent a message to the deposed Sultan (King) of Malacca concerning the fate of the Portuguese embassy, which the Chinese held prisoner. When they received his reply, the Chinese officials then proceeded to execute the Portuguese embassy, slicing their bodies into multiple pieces. Chinese traders boycotted Malacca after it fell under Portuguese control, some Chinese in Java assisted in Muslim attempts to reconquer the city from Portugal using ships. The Java Chinese participation in retaking Malacca was recorded in "The Malay Annals of Semarang and Cerbon". trading the Chinese did business with Malays and Javanese instead of the Portuguese. However, with gradual improvement of relations and aid given against the Wokou pirates along China's shores, by 1557 Ming China finally agreed to allow the Portuguese to settle at Macau in a new Portuguese trade colony. The Malay Sultanate of Johor also improved relations with the Portuguese and fought alongside them against the Aceh Sultanate.

==== Relations with Bornean Sultanate ====
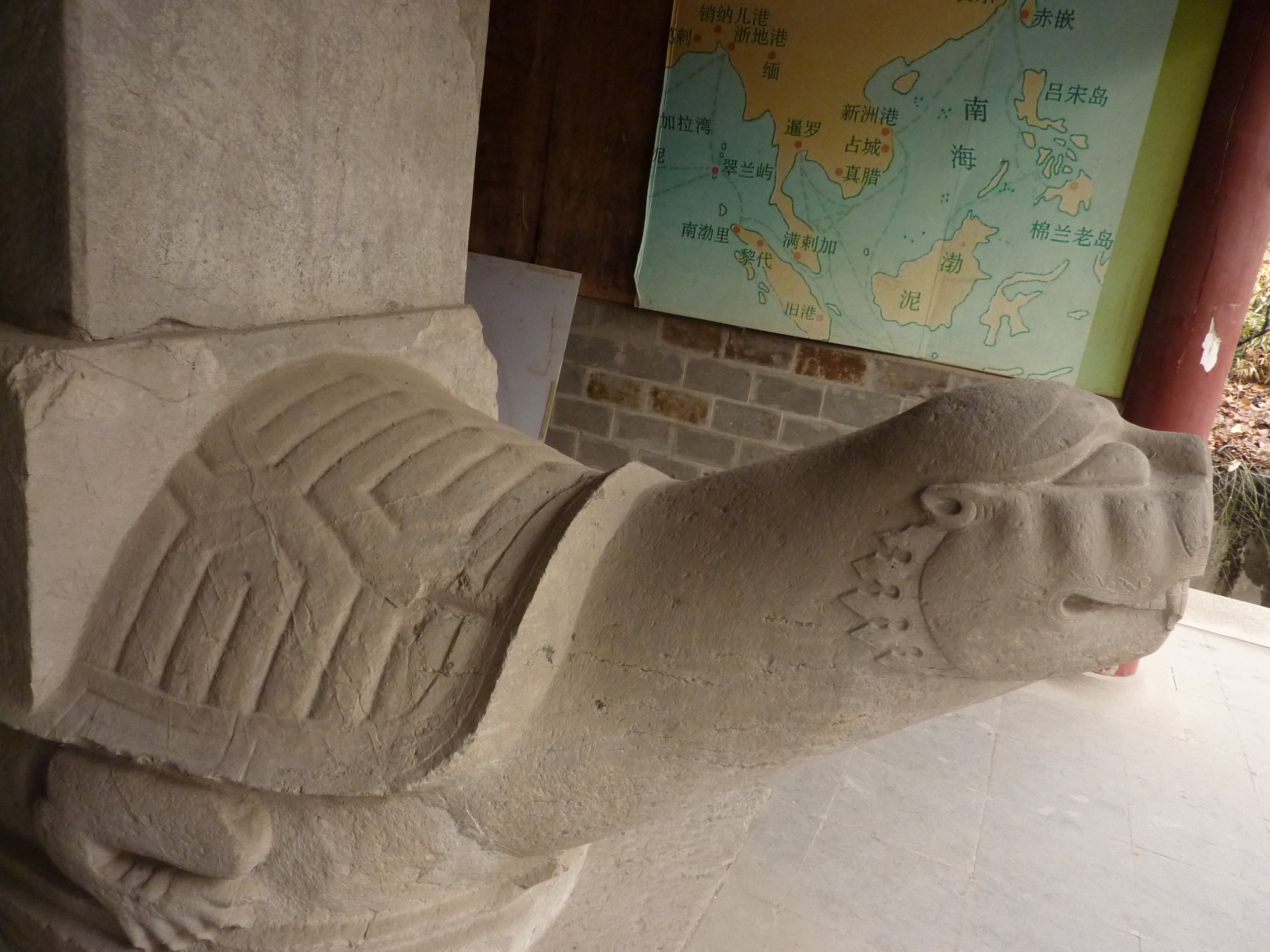
A stone tortoise with a stele in memory of Ma-na-jih-chia-na in Nanjing.

As China had been under the conquest of Mongol Empire, all Chinese vassal state subsequently controlled by the Mongol emperors of China. Early in 1292, Kublai Khan is said to have sending an expedition to northern Borneo, before departing for the invasion of Java in 1293. As a result of this campaign, it is believed that many of his followers in addition to other Chinese traders eventually settled and established their own colony at Kinabatangan River. In the 14th century, Brunei became the vassal state of Majapahit but in 1370 transferred its allegiance to Ming dynasty of China. The Maharaja Karna of Borneo then paid a visit to Nanjing with his family until his death. He was succeeded by his son Hsia-wang who agreed to send tribute to China once every three years. Since then, Chinese junks came to northern Borneo with cargoes of spices, bird nests, shark fins, camphor, rattan and pearls. More Chinese traders eventually settled in Kinabatangan, as stated in both Brunei and Sulu records. A younger sister of Ong Sum Ping (Huang Senping), the Governor of the Chinese settlement then married Sultan Ahmad of Brunei. Perhaps due to this relationship, a burial place with 2,000 wooden coffins, some estimated to be 1,000 years old, were discovered in Agop Batu Tulug Caves in the Kinabatangan area. It is believed that this type of funeral culture was brought by traders from mainland China and Indochina to northern Borneo as similar wooden coffins were also discovered in these countries. In addition with the discovery of Chinese ceramics from a shipwreck in Tanjung Simpang Mengayau which estimated to be from 960 to 1127 A.D. of Song dynasty and Vietnamese Đông Sơn drum in Bukit Timbang Dayang on Banggi Island that had existed between 2,000 and 2,500 years ago.

=== Peranakan Chinese ===
In old times the first group of Chinese people in Malaysia used to be held in high regard by Malays. Some old Malays in the past may have taken the word "Baba", referring to Chinese males, and put it into their name, when this used to be the case.

=== British colonialism ===
The British involvement in Malay politics began in the 18th century with the establishment of trading posts in Penang (formerly part of Kedah) and were interested in the tin resources of the Malay Peninsula and sought to protect their trading interests in the region, by treaties and agreements with local rulers, the British gradually expanded their influence and control over various Malay states. These were significantly influenced by trade and the strategic importance of these locations for British commercial interests. While Sir Stamford Raffles's establishment of a British trading post in Singapore in 1819 was a key event, the colonization of these areas was a broader process driven by various factors beyond just Raffles's actions. The British also had a hand in influencing Malay politics, establishing trading posts, and ultimately gaining control of the island of Singapore with the founding of modern Singapore by the formal treaty of British East India Company, Singapore was developed as a thriving colony and port, eventually becoming the seat of government for the Straits Settlements as the British had bought Indians and Chinese workers to Singapore, along with existing Malay populations and other traders once were among the earliest inhabitants, and many participated in fishing, craftsmanship, or wage labor, where they support the colony's growing economy by developing the island's infrastructure and plantations. In 1841, while the British are at war with the Qing Empire at the First Opium War, the Second Battle of Chuenpi became a major victory for the British Empire as Charles Elliot declared the cession of Hong Kong to the United Kingdom, with Henry Pottinger became the first Governor of Hong Kong in 1843. The Battle of Singapore became a major British defeat when it fell to the Japanese occupation in February 1942 during World War II which went on until it was liberated on 12 September 1945.

=== Cold War era ===
During the Cold War, Chairman of the Chinese Communist Party Mao Zedong's foreign policy was to support revolutionary leftist organisations worldwide. They subsequently supported Chin Peng's Malayan Communist Party and its military wing, the Malayan National Liberation Army as well another Communist party in Borneo, the North Kalimantan Communist Party under Bong Kee Chok. The Malayan Declaration of Independence was proclaimed and achieved independence from Britain on 31 August 1957. Singapore remained part of Malaysia until it was separated on 9 August 1965 as the "Republic of Singapore". Since most of the members and soldiers of MCP and NKCP were ethnic Chinese, the Malaysian government and other non-ethnic Chinese population viewed the ethnic Chinese population in Malaysia as 'fifth columns' and with distrust. But following the reforms initiated by Deng Xiaoping, the Chinese government support for Communist insurgencies worldwide gradually declined.

== Modern times ==
Diplomatic relations were established on 31 May 1974.

Following the end of the Cold War, diplomatic foreign relations between China and Malaysia immediately and positively changed. That being said, political and cultural connections between the two nations began to strengthen. Both countries are full members of APEC, and there is a sizeable population of Chinese in Malaysia. The Handover of Hong Kong from the United Kingdom to China had marked the end of 156 years of British colonial rule on 1 July 1997 where Hong Kong became the special administrative region of China, following the Sino-British Joint Declaration in 1984 between the British Prime Minister Margaret Thatcher and Chinese premier Zhao Ziyang in Beijing.

=== Diplomatic ties ===
Malaysian and Chinese officials meet together at the Strategic Consultation meetings which is held alternately between Malaysia and China every year. The Strategic Consultation meetings began as bilateral consultations in 1991. The consultation meetings were made to share and exchange views on various bilateral, regional and issues of mutual interest and also to follow up on matters discussed by the leaders of both countries. The bilateral consultations was later renamed as strategic consultation in 2010 to reflect the growing importance of Malaysia-China relations within the political-security framework of the Asia-Pacific region. The first one was held in Putrajaya in 2011 while the second was held in Beijing in 2012.

Bilateral exchange activities that have been done by Malaysia and China as of 2012 are the establishment of China-Malaysia Qinzhou Industrial Park and Malaysia-China Kuantan Industrial Park in (the latter officially opened on 5 February 2013), and the speedy approval by China to loan a pair giant pandas for Malaysia. Both countries also exchange views on current developments happening in the South East Asia. Both countries are adhered to the letter Declaration on the Conduct of Parties in the SEA (South East Asia) which continues the peace and stability that benefits China and the South East Asia region.

On 28 August 2012, Malaysia and China officials at the 2nd Strategic Consultation between Malaysia and China in Beijing agreed to make 2014 as "Malaysia-China Friendship Year" to commemorate the 40th anniversary of the establishment of diplomatic relations. The Malaysian delegation led by the Malaysia's Foreign Ministry's secretary-general Tan Sri Mohd Radzi Abdul Rahman and China's Vice-Foreign Minister Fu Ying also agreed that appropriate activities would be organised to celebrate the occasion.

On 16 April 2014, China planned to send two pairs of pandas named Fu Wa and Feng Yi to Malaysia to mark their 40-year anniversary of diplomatic ties, but were however postponed following the Malaysia Airlines Flight 370 incident. The two pandas later arrived at Kuala Lumpur International Airport on 21 May 2014 and were placed at the National Zoo of Malaysia (Zoo Negara).

In February and March 2024, Malaysian PM Anwar Ibrahim criticised the growing 'China-phobia' sentiment in western nations, insisting that Malaysia can be friends with both China and the West. China's embassy minister expressed appreciation for Anwar's comments, adding that Malaysia was a friendly neighbour and a priority in China's neighbourhood diplomacy.

In mid April 2025, General Secretary of the Chinese Communist Party Xi Jinping visited Malaysia and met with Malaysian Prime Minister Anwar Ibrahim in Kuala Lumpur. The two leaders issued a joint statement about resolving disputes between ASEAN and China on the South China Sea, reaffirming bilateral cooperation in international institutions, Malaysia's support for the One China policy, and describing the Gaza Strip as an inalienable part of Palestine.

=== Economic trade and relations ===
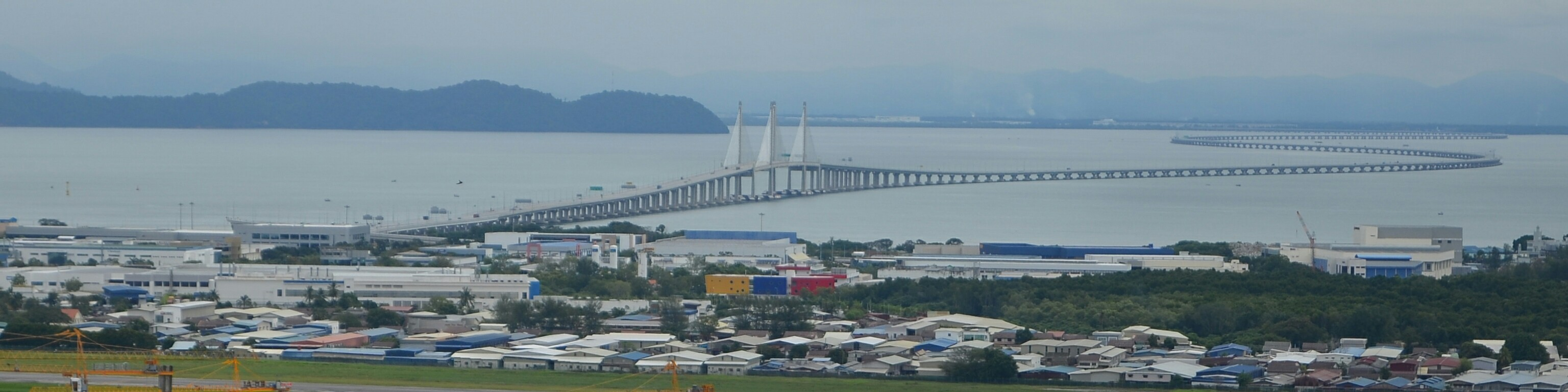
The Second Penang Bridge, partly built by China Harbour Engineering and completed in 2014, is currently Southeast Asia's second longest bridge.

The long-standing trade relationship between China and Malaysia also dates back to the early 80s where the now I-Berhad's Chairman Tan Sri Lim Kim Hong successfully ventured into the China market with his Dreamland spring mattress. The trade agreement was signed in November 1984 in Shanghai, witnessed by the then Deputy Trade Minister, Y.B. Dato' Oo Gin Sun. From there Tan Sri Lim Kim Hong established over 14 factories all over China and also ventured into the power plant business.

Malaysia was China's top trading partner within Association of Southeast Asian Nations (ASEAN) until 2017, when they were overtaken by Vietnam. The two-way trade volume between China and Malaysia in 2013 reached $106 billion, making Malaysia China's third-largest trade partner in Asia, just behind Japan and South Korea and eighth largest overall. On 31 May 2014, during Najib Razak's visit to China where he was welcomed by China's Premier Li Keqiang, China and Malaysia pledged to increase bilateral trade to US$160 billion by 2017. They also agreed to upgrade economic and financial co-operation, especially in the production of halal food, water processing and railway construction. China's transformation into a major economic power in the 21st century has led to an increase of foreign investments in the bamboo network, a network of overseas Chinese businesses operating in the markets of Southeast Asia that share common family and cultural ties.

Countries which signed cooperation documents related to the Belt and Road Initiative

China subsequently emerged as the major investor in Malaysia, funding large infrastructure projects nationwide with a huge investment with the country become the platform for China firms' to enter ASEAN markets. There is also a Malaysia China Business Council. However, Kit Wei Zheng at Citi argued that since many of these projects led to significant overcapacity, he believed these projects were being solely motivated by Chinese geopolitical interests. For example, he believed this would make control of the Straits of Malacca vulnerable to China.

In 2009, Malaysia and China signed five agreements to expand their cooperation in trade and investment, particularly focused on the financial services sector.

In November 2016, Malaysia and China signed US$30 million worth of deals on energy and transportation infrastructure issues.

In 2017, Malaysia joined the Belt and Road Initiative (BRI). Malaysia has several BRI projects, including the East Coast Rail Line, Kuantan Port Expansion, Green Technology Park in Pahang, Forest City, Robotic Future City, and Samalaju Industrial Park Steel Complex. In September 2018, Minister of Finance Lim Guan Eng cancelled two contracts, worth approximately $2.795 billion, with China Petroleum Pipeline Bureau for oil and gas pipelines.

Following his 2018 election victory, Malaysian Prime Minister Mahathir Mohamad renegotiated the East Coast Rail project. The re-negotiations changed the rail route, pushed back the completion date, and reduced the price of the project by a little more than a third.

On 26 November 2023, Malaysian Prime Minister Anwar Ibrahim announced visa free for Chinese citizens. On 1 December 2023, spokesperson Mao Ning for the Chinese Ministry of Foreign Affairs announced visa free for Malaysian citizens and stay less than 15 days.

In June 2024, China and Malaysia renewed their five-year economic and trade cooperation agreement during Chinese Premier Li Qiang's visit with Prime Minister Anwar Ibrahim in Malaysia.

=== South China Sea dispute ===
As of at least June 2024, Malaysia disagrees with China's claims in the South China Sea. Malaysia rarely criticizes China publicly on the issue and tends to address its position through diplomatic channels.

Former Malaysian Prime Minister Mahathir Mohamad said that China was not a threat to anyone in the South China Sea dispute and was not worried about aggression from China, accusing the United States of provoking China and trying to turn China's neighbours against China. Mahathir believes Malaysia could profit from China's economic growth through co-operation with China, although he has repeatedly slammed the Chinese investment in Malaysia for his fear over the large migration of new Chinese people to Malaysia.

In March 2013, Malaysian authorities were seen as displaying no concern over China conducting a military exercise at James Shoal. In August 2013, Malaysian minister suggested that it might work with China over their South China Sea claims and ignore the other claimants, with its Defence Minister Hishamuddin Hussein saying that Malaysia had no problem with China patrolling the South China Sea, and telling ASEAN, America, and Japan that "Just because you have enemies, doesn't mean your enemies are my enemies".

On 2 June 2014, Malaysia and China signed a joint communique addressing both South China Sea issues and trade development, stressing the importance of peace, security, and stability.

In June 2015, Malaysian authorities began to lodge a protest to China after a Chinese vessel was detected entering Malaysian territorial waters and found anchored at Luconia Shoals.

On 12 July 2016, the historical and internationally-binding South China Sea Arbitration, organized under the United Nations Convention on the Law of the Sea (UNCLOS), rejected certain forms of Chinese claims, notably the maritime claims of China, within the so-called nine-dash line, which the court effectively invalidated. The ruling was welcomed by Malaysia. The court did not rule on matters of territorial sovereignty since that is not part of the court's scope. (Note: PCA Award, Section V(F)(d)(264, 266, 267), p. 113.) (Note: PCA Award, Section V(F)(d)(278), p. 117.) As of November 2023, 27 governments had called for the ruling to be respected, including Malaysia, Vietnam, the Philippines, the United States, Japan, South Korea, Indonesia, the United Kingdom, and France. It was rejected by eight governments, including China (PRC), Taiwan (ROC), and North Korea.

China and Malaysia established a joint dialogue mechanism on 13 September 2019 in an effort to enhance cooperation and dialogue on South China Sea issues.

In June 2021, Malaysia summoned the Chinese envoy after a formation of Chinese military aircraft conducted operations near Sarawak, which Malaysia's foreign minister Hishammuddin Hussein stated was a "breach of the Malaysian airspace and sovereignty". The Chinese embassy in Kuala Lumpur later stated the Chinese aircraft were operating in international airspace.

In October 2021, Malaysia summoned the Chinese Ambassador to protest the "presence and activities" of Chinese vessels in Malaysia's exclusive economic zone off the coasts of Sabah and Sarawak in contravention of the United Nations Convention on the Law of the Sea.

On 6 April 2026, Malaysian Prime Minister Anwar Ibrahim called for ASEAN-led solutions to South China Sea tensions, citing disputes involving China, and emphasized safeguarding national sovereignty without external interference.

=== Taiwan ===
On 16 August 2026, Malaysian prime minister Anwar Ibrahim gave an interview with Al Jazeera English, where he said "I see Taiwan as part of China, period" and that this was "accepted by all". Regarding the possibility of the use of force by China to achieve unification, Anwar said he would use force to "protect the sanctity and unity of" Malaysia if a Malaysian state was attempting to break away. His remarks were praised by China's foreign ministry, while Taiwan condemned them.

== Opinion polling ==
A 2014 survey conducted by the Pew Research Center showed 66% of Malaysians were concerned that territorial disputes between China and neighbouring countries could lead to a military conflict. However, on the economic side, a 2017 survey conducted by Merdeka Center revealed 70% of Malaysians supported China's presence and investment in the country. A survey published in 2026 by the Pew Research Center found that 75% of Malaysians had a favorable view of China, while 25% had an unfavorable view.

According to a 2022 survey conducted by Renmin University of China and the Global Times Research Center on Chinese views of ASEAN, Malaysia was rated the second most appealing ASEAN member by local respondents (tied with Thailand and behind Singapore).

== See also ==
- Hong Kong–Malaysia relations
- Taiwan–Malaysia relations
- String of Pearls
- Debt-trap diplomacy for allegations of geopolitical implications
