= Chinese Taipei School =

Chinese Taipei School may refer to:

- Chinese Taipei School Kuala Lumpur
- Chinese Taipei School Penang
