= Anne Hung =

Taiwanese diplomat

- 洪慧珠
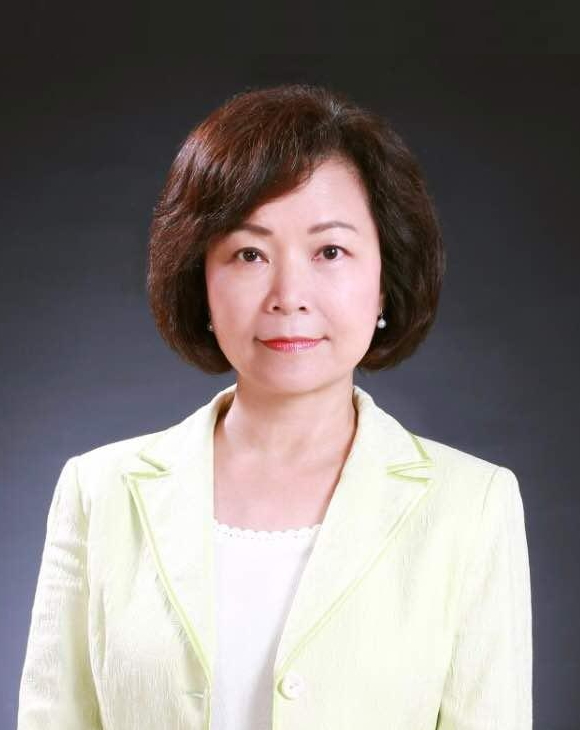
- Official portrait, 2018

Representative of the Republic of China to Malaysia
- In office July 2018 – January 2023
- Preceded by: James Chang
- Succeeded by: Phoebe Yeh

Personal details
- Born: Taiwan
- Education: National Taiwan University (LLB); National Chengchi University (MA); University of California, Berkeley (LLM)
- Occupation: Diplomat

Chinese name
- Traditional Chinese: 洪慧珠
- Simplified Chinese: 洪慧珠
Transcriptions
Standard Mandarin
- Hanyu Pinyin: Hóng Huìzhū
Southern Min
- Hokkien POJ: Hông Hūi-chiu

Anne Hung (Chinese: 洪慧珠; pinyin: Hóng Huìzhū) is a Taiwanese diplomat who became the representative to Malaysia from 2018 to 2023. She held several positions in the Ministry of Foreign Affairs and was also the deputy director of the Treaty and Law Department of the Ministry of Foreign Affairs, the European Director of the Ministry of Foreign Affairs, the Director General of the Taipei Economic and Cultural Office in Boston, and an official of the Taipei Economic and Cultural Representative in the United States.

== Early life and education ==
Hung attended law school at National Taiwan University and graduated with a Bachelor of Laws (LL.B.) in 1980. She then earned a Master of Arts (M.A.) in diplomacy from National Chengchi University in 1986 and a Master of Laws (LL.M.) from the University of California, Berkeley, in 1992.

== Diplomatic career ==
=== Ministry of Foreign Affairs ===
When Presidents Hu Jintao and Sarkozy met in April 2009 ahead of the G20 summit in London, the Press Gazette released a press release. Anne noted that while France had reaffirmed the "One-China Policy" and maintained that Tibet is an integral part of China's territory in the Press Gazette, "the content of the communiqué does not mention Taiwan." She reiterated that, "the fact that Taiwan is a sovereign and independent country is unquestionable," and that the Ministry of Foreign Affairs had directed the representative office in France to write a letter to the French side.

Hung, the Director of the Ministry of Foreign Affairs' European Department, was moved to the Taipei Economic and Cultural Office in Boston in August 2009, becoming the organization's first female director. She frequently wrote to the American media during her time to share her opinions about Taiwan's membership in the UN Framework Convention on Climate Change and the sovereignty of the Diaoyu Archipelago.

=== Malaysia ===
When Kaohsiung Mayor Han Kuo-yu and his spouse traveled to Malaysia in February 2019, there were rumors that Tsai Ing-wen's government was based in Kahan. Hung was present when Han signed the deal with the business folks, but they did not speak to each other at all. Speaking from the platform, Anne has consistently highlighted the successes of the government's agricultural export. She replied, "There really isn't any (repression)." In terms of administration, we are impartial. I also informed you about the domestic visiting group yesterday. We have to try our hardest to help. I only wish to take a holiday there as I was unable to return for the Spring Festival. I visit my folks back home every time."

According to Hung on 19 August 2019, Taiwanese investors are urged to make investments in Malaysia when they repatriate cash from China. She added that this supports the development of trade relations between Taiwan and Malaysia. After returning from China, Taiwan is eager to assist Taiwanese investors in Malaysia, she stated, adding that Malaysians in the business community are welcome to provide pertinent information.

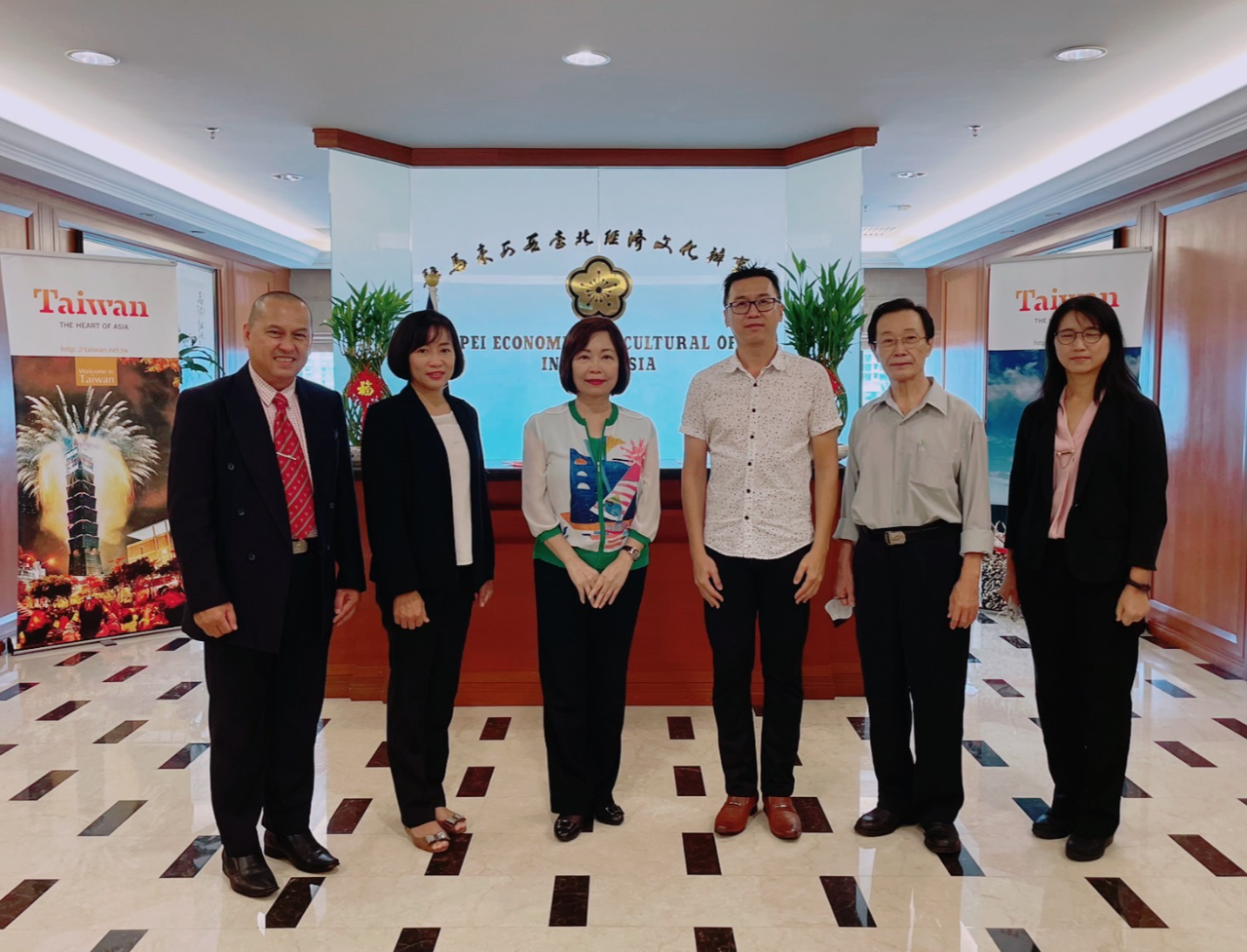
Anne (middle) with other diplomats in Malaysian office, 2022

When a Malaysian female student at Xiaoming Evergreen University returned to an off-campus dormitory in October 2020, she was sexually assaulted and raped, resulting in her death. This incident garnered media attention from both countries. Her parents flew from Kuala Lumpur to Taiwan, and Hung, the Malaysian representative, personally escorted them there, expressing that she could feel their parents' anguish from "the mother's heart".

On 7 March 2021, Representative Anne participates in an online Chinese New Year celebration organized by the National Taiwan University Alumni Association in Malaysia. In an effort to encourage study in Taiwan and increase interest among non-Chinese Malaysian students in continuing their education there, Representative Hung received an invitation to speak in a webinar titled "Study in Taiwan" hosted by the Selangor State Education Department on 7 August. She urged students to follow their goals in Taiwan and come back to the community to help after their studies.

At the 2023 Chinese Taipei School Kuala Lumpur New Year Flag Raising Ceremony and School Fair on 1 January 2023, Representative Hung and colleagues from the Taipei Economic and Cultural Office in Malaysia wish everyone a happy new year. She expressed her gratitude to the school for hosting the annual flag-raising ceremony on the opening day of the school year during her remarks.

Diplomatic posts
| Preceded by James Chang | Representative of the Republic of China to Malaysia; July 2018 – January 2023 | Succeeded by Phoebe Yeh |
