= 2020 murder of Malaysian student at Chang Jung Christian University =

2020 murder in Taiwan

The 2020 murder of Malaysian student at Chang Jung Christian University, occurred in Guiren District, Tainan City. On the evening of October 28, 2020, a Malaysian female student in her third year of a bachelor’s program at Chang Jung Christian University was forcibly abducted while returning to her off-campus residence. She was sexually assaulted and murdered, and her body was later abandoned in a mountainous area of Alian District, Kaohsiung City.The case drew attention in both Taiwan and Malaysia. The suspect, Liang Yu-zhi, was sentenced to death in both the first and second trials in Taiwan; however, the third trial overturned and remanded the case. In the retrial (first remand), he was again sentenced to death, while the crimes of corpse abandonment and attempted rape were ruled to carry a combined fixed-term imprisonment of 4 years and 4 months.In the second remand trial, the sentence was changed to life imprisonment with deprivation of civil rights for life, and 8 years for robbery; the case remained appealable. On April 23, 2026, the Supreme Court dismissed the appeal, upholding the life sentence and lifelong deprivation of civil rights as final.

== Background ==
=== Victim ===
The deceased was a 24-year-old woman who had graduated from the Diploma in Business Management program at Methodist Pilley Institute in Sibu, Sarawak. She later entered Chang Jung Christian University in Taiwan to pursue further studies in international business; the two schools are sister institutions. On August 13, 2019, the victim returned to her alma mater in Malaysia to give a sharing session about studying abroad, stating that Taiwan had good public safety and encouraging junior students to pursue studies at Chang Jung Christian University.

=== Perpetrator ===
The suspect, Liang Yu-zhi, was a resident of Alian District, Kaohsiung City, unemployed, and previously worked as a truck driver. He lived with his parents. He had a prior record of theft, including breaking into a residence in 2013, and had also committed five thefts of women’s underwear.In late September 2020, he attempted to abduct another person but failed when the victim escaped.

== Course of Events ==
On the evening of October 28, 2020, at around 8:00 p.m., the victim left campus alone to return to her rented off-campus residence. She was last seen near the elevated section of the Taiwan Railways Administration Shalun line, along Changda Road, walking north along a pathway beneath the viaduct before going missing.

When first arrested, Liang denied the crime, at one point claiming, "She ran away after being frightened by me," and later changing his statement to say that the victim jumped out of the vehicle shortly after getting in. He eventually confessed that the victim had been strangled to death and that her body had been abandoned nearDagangshan in Kaohsiung.

Liang then led police to the location where the body was abandoned. The site was approximately a ten-minute drive from his residence, nearLianfeng Temple in the Dagangshan area. Police found the victim’s body on a slope about three meters below ground level.

Prosecutors from the Taiwan Ciaotou District Prosecutors Officedetermined that Liang was suspected of offenses including rape with intent to kill, robbery with intent to kill, and other related crimes. Considering the risk of flight and repeated offenses, they requested detention without visitation. The judge approved detention but did not prohibit visitation.

On November 21, 2020, the victim’s memorial service was held atFu Gui Memorial Park in Sibu, Sarawak. The ceremony was officiated by Hsu Chun-kai, president of Methodist Pilley Institute, and her ashes were interred at the same location on the same day.

== Prosecution and Trial ==
=== Prosecution ===
On November 2, 2020, the victim’s family commissioned Lin Rui-cheng, chairman of the Taiwan Bar Association, to file lawsuits across borders, including civil litigation for wrongful death, criminal prosecution, and compensation for crime victims. On December 25 of the same year, the Ciaotou District Prosecutors Office concluded its investigation and formally charged the suspect with attempted rape, rape and intentional killing, robbery with intentional killing, and corpse abandonment. The prosecution stated that the defendant was beyond rehabilitation and specifically sought the death penalty. After the case was transferred to court, the Ciaotou District Court held a detention hearing and ordered continued detention of Liang Yu-zhi.

=== Trial ===
On March 18, 2022, the Taiwan Ciaotou District Courtsentenced Liang Yu-zhi to Capital punishment in the first instance for attempted rape, rape and murder, robbery and murder, and corpse abandonment.

On March 23, 2023, the Kaohsiung Branch of the Taiwan High Court sentenced Liang to 2 years and 10 months for attempted rape and 2 years for corpse abandonment, dismissing part of the appeal, while still imposing the death penalty and lifelong deprivation of civil rights for rape and murder; the case remained appealable.

On May 15, 2023, a Taiwanese court ruled that Liang Yu-zhi must compensate the victim’s parents more than NT$5.93 million (approximately RM 860,000).

On June 14, 2023, the Supreme Court found inconsistencies in the second-instance judgment, noting that while it determined the suspect’s criminal plan did not include murder, it also stated that murder was part of the plan. Due to this contradiction and insufficient investigation by the second-instance court, the Supreme Court revoked the death sentence and remanded the case for retrial. However, the sentences for attempted rape and corpse abandonment—2 years and 10 months and 2 years respectively—were finalized.

On January 15, 2025, in the first remand retrial, the Kaohsiung Branch of the Supreme Court again sentenced Liang Yu-zhi to death for rape and murder; the decision remained appealable. For corpse abandonment and attempted rape, the second-instance sentences remained at 2 years and 2 years and 10 months, and had already been finalized by the Supreme Court. Regarding the death penalty, the Supreme Court again overturned the ruling on April 18 and remanded the case for retrial.

On April 18, 2025, the Supreme Court held that the retrial judgment failed to adequately explain mitigating sentencing factors favorable to Liang Yu-zhi, and thus revoked and remanded the case again.

In January 2026, the Kaohsiung High Court (second remand) sentenced Liang Yu-zhi to life imprisonment.

On April 23, 2026, the Supreme Court dismissed the appeal and upheld the life sentence and lifelong deprivation of civil rights as final.

== Administrative Actions ==
=== Police Reassignment ===
Because a similar attempted abduction incident had occurred on September 30, 2020, and the victim had reported it to the Datan Police Station under the Guiren Precinct without a formal report being filed, police were accused of covering up the case. Tainan City Police Commissioner Chan Yung-mao stated that he had requested disciplinary action from Mayor Huang Wei-che. Guiren Precinct Chief Yang Ching-yu and Datan Police Station Chief Chang Chung-ken were reassigned as disciplinary measures.

=== Impeachment and Disciplinary Action ===
The then Guiren Precinct Chief Yang Ching-yu, Datan Police Station Chief Chang Chung-ken, and police officer Kao Wu-yuan were later impeached by the Control Yuan for failing to fulfill supervisory responsibilities during case handling and violating the Civil Servants Service Act. They were referred to the Disciplinary Court, which issued decisions on May 31, 2022, regarding their sanctions.

== Reactions ==
=== Chang Jung Christian University ===
After the victim was abducted and murdered, it was discovered during the investigation that another female student had experienced a similar attempted abduction at the same location at the end of the previous month (September 30, 2020). The suspect admitted during police interrogation that "at the end of September, I tried to grab someone nearby, but couldn’t pull her away with my bare hands, so it failed." On October 1, the student reported the incident to the university. However, after being informed, the university’s campus safety center failed to follow regulations by not filing a campus safety report or notifying the Ministry of Education (which requires reporting within 72 hours; the Ministry found no such report after reviewing records for half a month). The university also did not issue any warnings to other students to raise awareness and ensure safety. Ministry of Education (Taiwan) Pan Wen-chung stated that responsibility would be pursued. Some members of the public believed that greater vigilance at the time could have prevented the tragedy.

In addition, students had raised concerns about insufficient lighting on roads inside and outside the campus. The university’s General Affairs Office responded that off-campus street lighting fell under the jurisdiction of the district office and that the university had no authority to manage it, and did not proactively intervene or contact the district office for improvements. After the incident, Chang Jung Christian University stated that it had reported the issue to the Gueiren District Office; however, the district office said it had not received any such request from the university.

Some students criticized the university for "doing nothing" to ensure student safety, and pointed out that the university president had not come forward to respond, stating that "even the Premier has apologized, but the president still refuses to do so." The university responded that President Lee Yong-lung was occupied with arrangements to contact the victim’s family to come to Taiwan, and that other matters would be handled later. At present, response measures were delegated to Secretary-General Kuan Mei-yen. Kuan stated that the university had already convened an emergency meeting regarding campus safety, but emphasized that the crime occurred off campus.

The university chaplain’s office issued a letter to faculty and staff expressing condolences and stating that faith could help overcome evil.Secretary-General Kuan Mei-yen also indicated that the victim’s diploma had been prepared for the family to collect. The university’s official website was also changed to a grayscale theme.

Dean of Student Affairs Tu Chia-ling and the director of the campus safety center, Instructor Chien Te-hsien, resigned to take responsibility, and their resignations were approved. University president Lee Yong-lung also requested disciplinary action and resigned to the board on Christmas Day, December 25. The Director of General Affairs, Yen Yi-wen, also resigned.

=== Suspect’s Parents ===
The suspect’s parents expressed hope to apologize to the victim’s parents in person. The victim’s parents arrived in Taiwan on the evening of November 1, and the suspect’s parents, through a local village chief, conveyed that their son had committed a grave wrongdoing and that they sincerely wished to apologize face-to-face, hoping the victim’s parents would accept their apology.

=== Victim’s Family ===
After learning that the second remand trial had changed the sentence to life imprisonment, the victim’s mother expressed disappointment, stating that excluding the death penalty on the grounds of "possibility of rehabilitation" failed to adequately reflect the severity of the crime.

=== Other Reactions ===
==== Taiwan ====
President Tsai Ing-wen of the Republic of China (Taiwan) convened a national security meeting on October 31, during which she led government Bureaucrat in a moment of silence before the meeting and expressed apologies to the victim’s family and the Malaysian government.

- Premier of the Republic of China Su Tseng-chang issued an apology to the family through Executive Yuan spokesperson Ting Yi-ming.
- Minister of Foreign Affairs Joseph Wu emphasized that regardless of the incident, Taiwan remains one of the friendliest and safest places in Asia.
  - Representative Anne Hung of the Taipei Economic and Cultural Office, Kuala Lumpur stated that, "as a mother," she empathized with the victim’s parents, adding that "this is a process of healing; they must remain strong, as they still have two sons to care for."
- Minister of the Interior Hsu Kuo-yung and National Police Agency Director-General Chen Chia-chin traveled south to handle the case and publicly apologized to the family.
  - Deputy Minister of the Interior Chen Tsung-yen visited the Guiren Precinct of the Tainan City Police Department on the evening of October 30, representing the minister, and jointly awarded bonuses with the Tainan City Government to officers who contributed to solving the case. He stated that the swift resolution within hours not only comforted the victim and family but also reassured the public. Chen described the case as an isolated incident and emphasized that Taiwan’s public security remains internationally recognized as strong, while also noting that assistance would be provided to the family in traveling to Taiwan.
  - National Police Agency Director-General Chen Chia-chin stated that personnel adjustments would be made within the Tainan City Police Department, while respecting the mayor’s decisions.
- Minister of Education Pan Wen-chung apologized to the family and Malaysia on October 31 and stated that responsibility within Chang Jung Christian University would be investigated.
  - Deputy Minister of Education Liu Meng-chi called for a review of university campus safety systems.
- Mayor of Tainan Huang Wei-che publicly apologized to the victim’s family.
  - Tainan City Police Commissioner Chan Yung-mao stated that he had requested disciplinary action, and Guiren Precinct Chief Yang Ching-yu was reassigned to an internal position.
- Kaohsiung Mayor Chen Chi-mai stated that surveillance camera inspections would be strengthened.
- Mayor of New Taipei Hou Yu-ih stated that the case should not be blamed solely on the police, and that the city government also bore responsibility and should face the issue collectively with strict accountability.
- Democratic Progressive Party Legislative Yuan Lo Mei-ling expressed deep sorrow.
- Kuomintang legislator Yeh Yu-lan stated that if the demand for "a life for a life" were to be fulfilled, it would require Malaysia to request the extradition of the suspect for trial.
- Taiwan People's Party legislator Chiu Chen-yuan stated that Taiwan–Malaysia relations have long been close, with Malaysian students forming the largest group of international students in Taiwan, and that graduates often become important bridges between the two regions. He warned that the incident would affect Malaysian students’ willingness to study in Taiwan, and called on the government to strengthen the social safety net, hold negligent parties accountable, and restore public confidence in Taiwan among Malaysians.
- Chang Jung Christian University president Lee Yong-lung later issued a public apology to the family and society.

==== Malaysia ====
- The Ministry of Foreign Affairs expressed sympathy and condolences to the victim’s family and pledged full assistance. It also urged Malaysian students studying in Taiwan to remain vigilant, ensure personal safety, and maintain regular contact with the Malaysian Friendship and Trade Centre in Taipei.
- Cheng Ming-chi, political secretary to the Chief Minister of Sarawak (and Youth Chief of the United People’s Party), stated that the Sarawak government would ensure smooth arrangements for the victim’s parents to retrieve her ashes in Taiwan and return to Sarawak, allowing them to travel from Kuala Lumpur directly to Sibu before undergoing quarantine.
- Tiong King Sing, chairman of the Democratic Progressive Democratic Party (Malaysia) and former Special Envoy to East Asia (2014–2018), called on Taiwanese law enforcement authorities on October 30 to severely punish the perpetrator and conduct a thorough and prompt investigation, not only to seek justice for the victim but also to address concerns among Malaysian students in Taiwan.
- Wong Soon Koh, president of the Parti Sarawak Bersatu and state assemblyman, stated that he would provide assistance within his capacity if the family needed help.
- Dato’ Chen Shao-hou, president of the Federation of Alumni Associations of Taiwan Universities, urged Taiwan’s judiciary to thoroughly investigate the case and severely punish the perpetrator.
- Zhang Ji-liang, president of the Sibu branch of the Sarawak Taiwan Alumni Association, stated that the association and universities would assist the family with travel permits and funeral arrangements, and urged Taiwanese students abroad to remain vigilant, avoid traveling alone, and stay in crowded areas when going out.
- Hsu Chun-kai, president of Methodist Pilley Institute in Sibu, led more than 50 faculty members, students, and alumni in a White Ribbon campaign to promote anti-violence and gender equality, commemorate the victim, and call for justice and fairness worldwide.
- The victim’s father strongly condemned the suspect, stating: "I will not look at that trash (the suspect). I will not forgive or excuse him. That is impossible. He destroyed our family. Since he took my daughter’s life, I hope he pays with his own life—a life for a life."
