= CTSP =

CTSP may refer to:

- Central Taiwan Science Park, an industrial park in Taiwan
- Chinese Taipei School Penang, an international school in Penang, Malaysia
