= List of presidents of the Malaysian Friendship and Trade Centre =

President of the Malaysian Friendship and Trade Centre
- Incumbent; Vacant
- Style: His Excellency
- Seat: Taipei, Republic of China (Taiwan)
- Appointer: Yang di-Pertuan Agong
- Inaugural holder: Hanafiah Hussin
- Formation: 1987
- Website: www.kln.gov.my/web/twn_taipei/home

The president of the Malaysian Friendship and Trade Centre is the head of Malaysia's diplomatic mission to the Republic of China (Taiwan). The position has the rank and status of an ambassador extraordinary and plenipotentiary and is based in the Malaysian Friendship and Trade Centre, Taipei.

== List of heads of mission ==
=== Presidents of the Malaysian Friendship and Trade Centre ===
| President | Term start | Term end |
|---|---|---|
| Hanafiah Hussin | 1987 | 1988 |
| Chan Teck Chuan | 1989 | 1991 |
| Syed Mansor Syed Kassim Barakbah | 1991 | 1993 |
| Abu Bakar Mahmud | 1993 | 1995 |
| Harun Mansor | 1996 | 1999 |
| Abdul Rahim Bakri | 11 July 2000 | 9 March 2004 |
| Ku Abd. Rahman Ku Ismail | 7 January 2005 | 7 June 2007 |
| Abdullah Mohd Salleh | 24 November 2007 | 1 June 2010 |
| Yong Teck Shing | 8 March 2011 | 30 June 2015 |
| Adeline Leong | 3 February 2016 | 30 June 2018 |
| Sharon Ho Swee Peng | 27 February 2019 | 25 February 2023 |
| Aznifah Isnariah Abdul Ghani | 16 July 2023 | Present |

== See also ==
- Malaysia–Taiwan relations
