= Malaysia–Taiwan relations =

- Malaysia: Taiwan

Diplomatic mission
- Malaysian Friendship and Trade Centre: Taipei Economic and Cultural Office in Malaysia

Envoy
- President Swee Peng Sharon Ho: Representative Annu Hung

Malaysia–Taiwan relations refers to bilateral foreign relations between Malaysia and Republic of China (Taiwan). The economic and the cultural relations are still maintained with Malaysia having a trade centre office in Taipei, and Taiwan has an economic and cultural centre in Kuala Lumpur.

== History ==
Relations were established in 1964, when Taiwan opened its Consulate in Kuala Lumpur. This was upgraded to a Consulate-General five years later.

However, in 1974, Malaysia established diplomatic relations with the People's Republic of China, leading to the closure of the Malaysian Consulate in Taipei.

An office of Malaysia Airlines in Taipei represented Malaysia's interests in Taiwan until 1982. In 1983, a Trade Office was opened, leading to the establishment of the "Friendship and Trade Exchange Centre", before it adopted its present name in 1987.

In order to represent its interests, Taiwan established the "Far East Travel and Trade Centre". This was upgraded in 1988, and renamed the "Taipei Economic and Cultural Centre". It adopted its present name in 1992.

== Economic relations ==
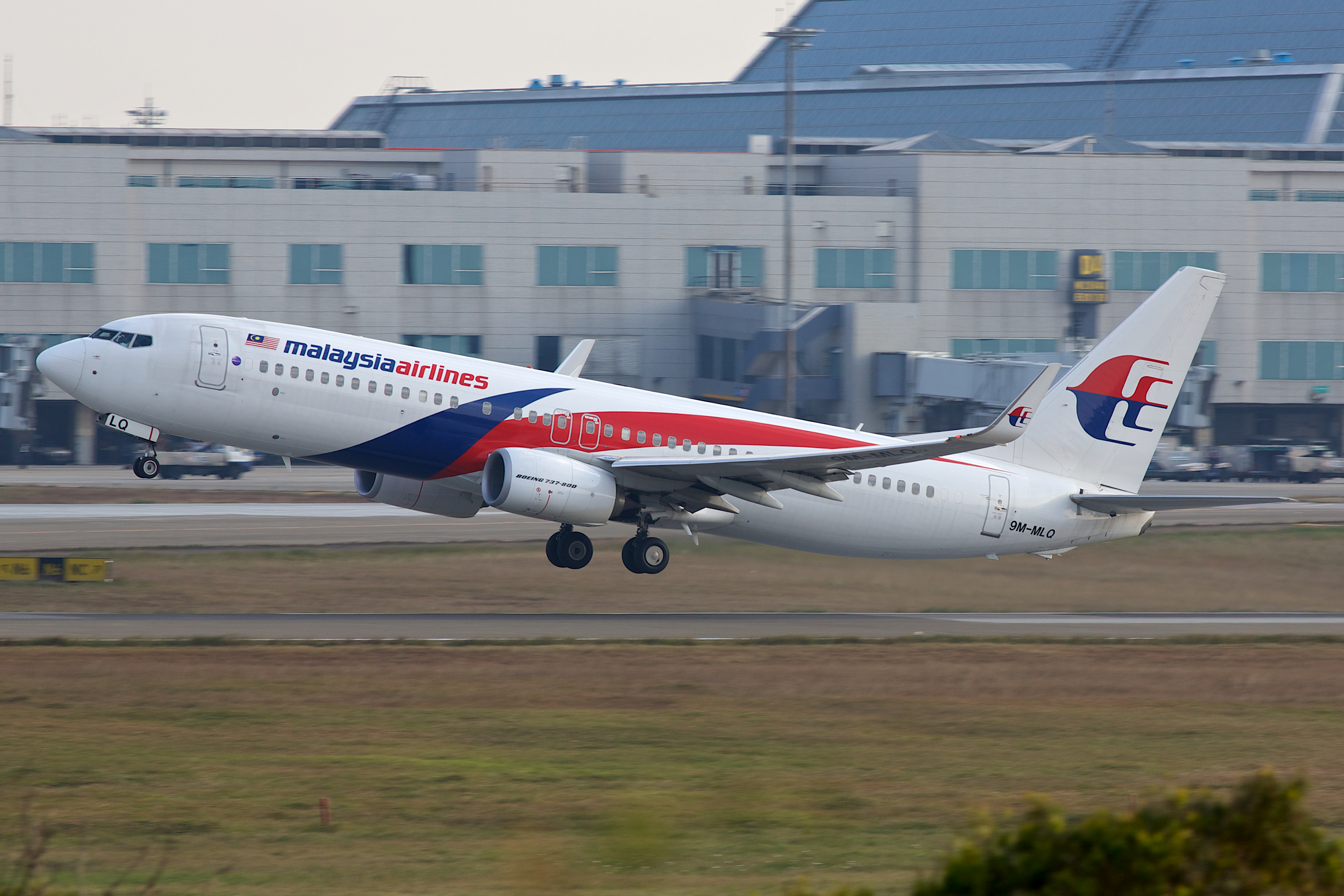
Malaysia Airlines aircraft in Taiwan

The total trade between Taiwan and Malaysia has always increased, from $678.3 million in 1985 to $2.10 billion in 1990, and from $5.85 billion in 1995 to $7.26 billion in 1997. The total reached $9.48 billion in 2004, with Malaysian exports worth around $5.4 billion and Taiwanese exports at US$4 billion. In 2012, Malaysia was the 8th largest trading partner for Taiwan with the total trade amounted to $15.2 billion while Taiwan became the 10th largest foreign investor in Malaysia with the total investments worth around $2.0 billion. Most of the trade between the two countries was based on liquefied natural gas (LNGs) and electrical machinery and equipment. Both countries have also made a commitment to explore in other ways especially in oil and gas sector, steel, furniture and other three new sectors such as pharmaceutical, food and cosmetics to enhance their economic co-operation.

On 27 March 2017, Selangor and Taipei signed a co-operation agreement on transportation, innovative industries, e-commerce and smart cities during Taipei Mayor Ko Wen-je visit to Malaysia. On 5 April 2017, Taiwan International Ports Corporation (TIPC) signed a memorandum of understanding (MoU) with Sabah Ports (SP) in line with the Taiwanese government “New Southbound Policy” to develop Southeast Asian market.

In 2023, Taiwan's Animal and Plant Health Inspection Agency applied for the ability to export pomeloes to Malaysia. This was approved in November 2024, and exports started in September 2025.

On 16 August 2026, Malaysian prime minister Anwar Ibrahim gave an interview with Al Jazeera English, where he said "I see Taiwan as part of China, period" and that this was "accepted by all". Regarding the possibility of the use of force by China to achieve unification, Anwar said he would use force to "protect the sanctity and unity of" Malaysia if a Malaysian state was attempting to break away. His remarks were praised by China's foreign ministry, while Taiwan condemned them.

== Education relations ==
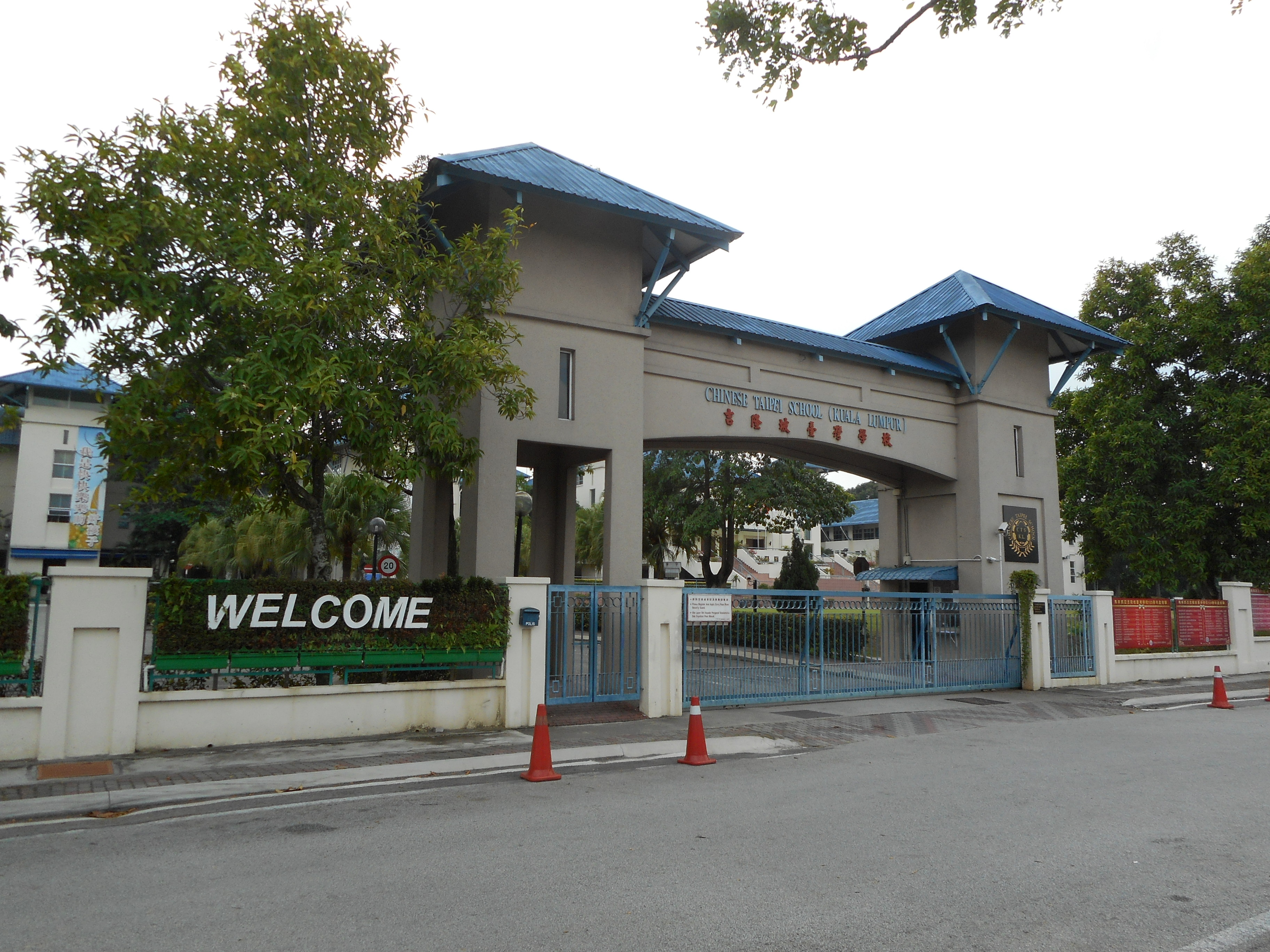
Chinese Taipei School Kuala Lumpur

Around 10,374 Malaysian students were studying in Taiwan in 2013, making Malaysia as the largest source of overseas foreign students in Taiwan.

Citizens of the Republic of China (Taiwan) residing in Malaysia are served by two international schools:

- Chinese Taipei School Kuala Lumpur
- Chinese Taipei School Penang

== Humanitarian relations ==
Aside from the economic relations, Taiwan has also provided aid to Malaysia especially in technical assistance. Taiwanese leaders have continuously advocated the Southward policy encouraging Taiwan's enterprises to investing more on Malaysia. During the visit of Taiwanese Vice-president Lien Chan to Malaysia in 1998, the country decided to collect $100 million from all of the Taiwanese enterprises in the country to save some local enterprises which were near to collapse.

The country also provided $100 million to $1 billion to help Malaysia recover from the impact of the 1997 Asian financial crisis. Also during the 1997 Southeast Asian haze, the Taiwanese authorities donated more than 100,000 respirators to Malaysia.

Early in 2014, Taiwan joined the search or MH370 where one of the airline passenger was a Taiwanese citizen. At the end of the year 2014 when Malaysia was suffering in the worst floods, Taiwan has sent a number of medical workers and volunteers with supplies and rescue equipment along with a money donation of MYR5,000 (US$1,429) to help Malaysian flood victims.

== Taiwanese museum and memorials in Malaysia ==
There are Taiwanese museums and memorials in Malaysia, such as the Sun Yat-sen Museum, Cho Huan Lai Memorial and Sandakan Massacre Memorial.

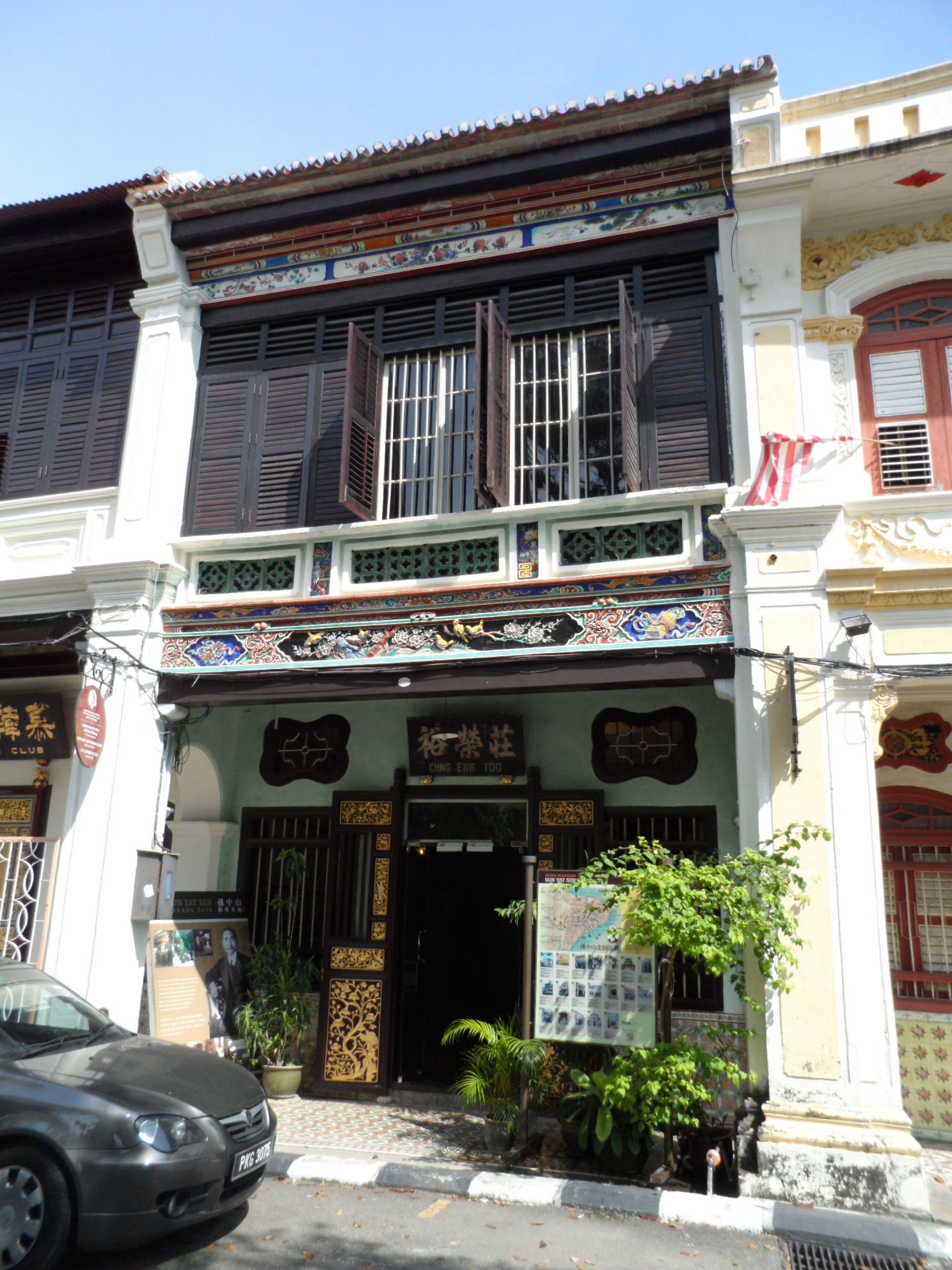
Sun Yat-sen Museum in Penang.

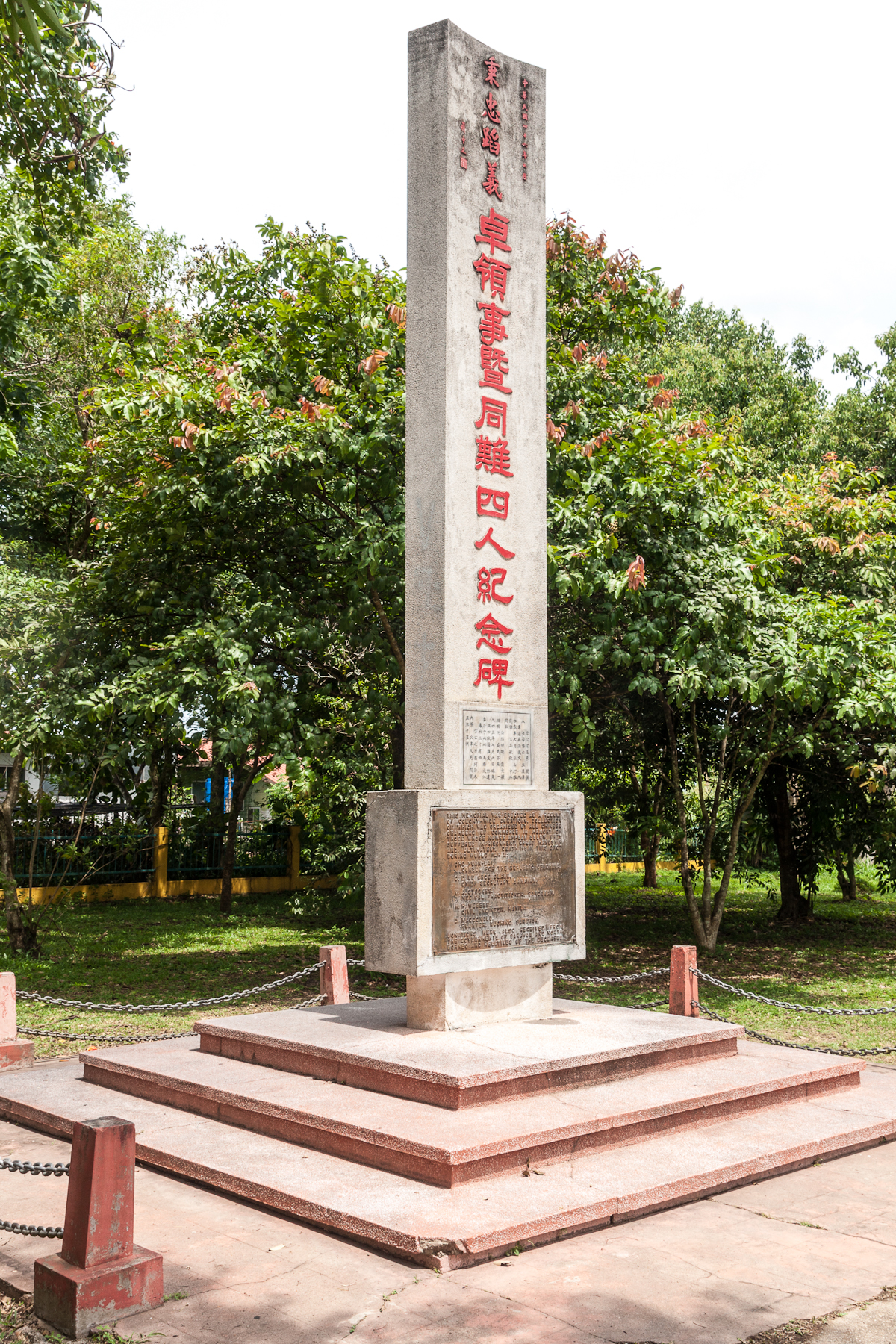
Cho Huan Lai Memorial in Keningau, Sabah.

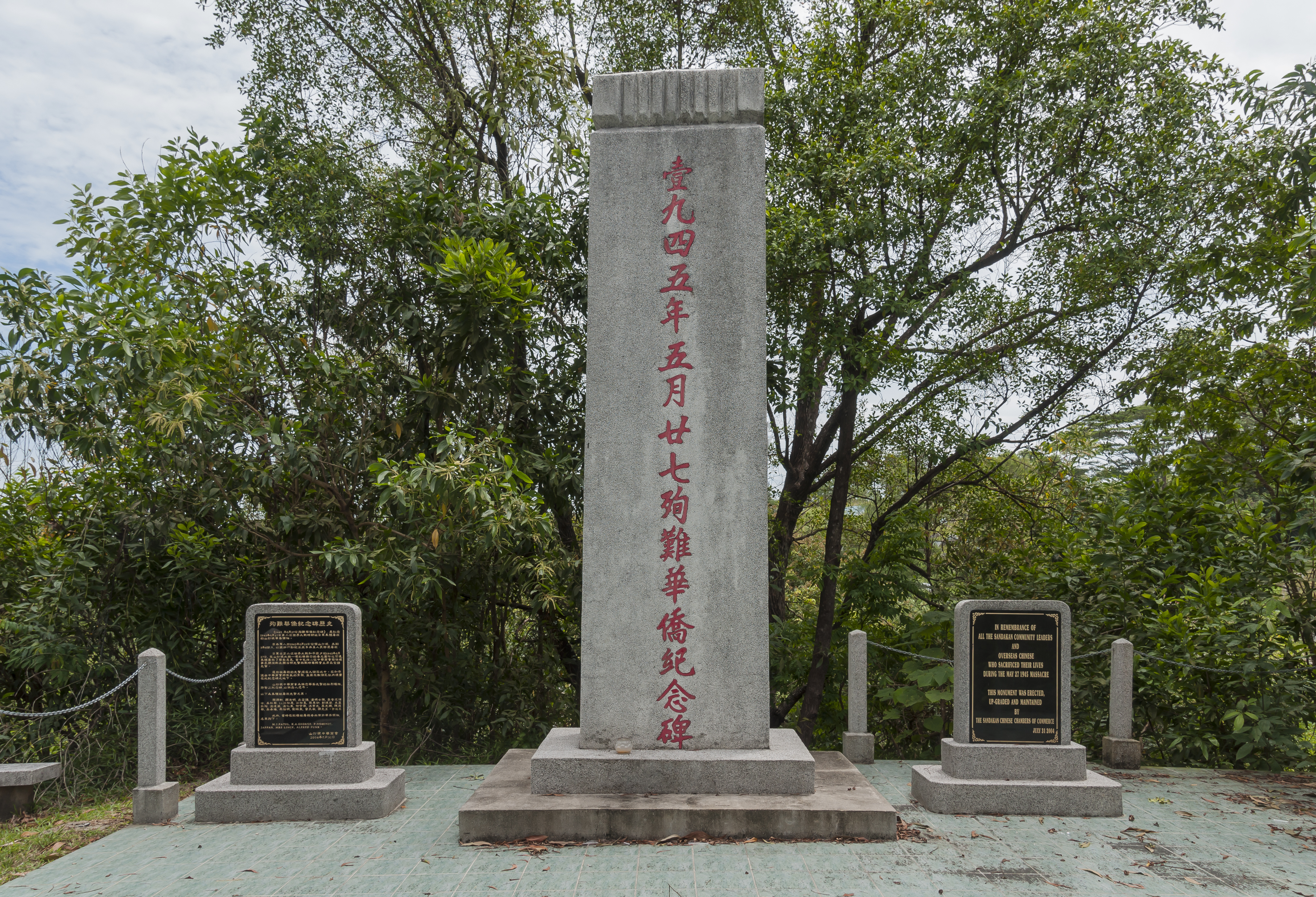
Sandakan Massacre Memorial in Sandakan, Sabah.

== Controversy ==
=== Deportation of Taiwanese fraud suspects to China ===
On 30 April 2016, 32 of 117 suspects arrested in relation to transnational telecom fraud were deported to China after first batch of 20 suspects from Malaysia had been deported into Taiwan. This was after another 45 Taiwanese citizens has been deported by the Kenyan government to China for a similar case. Taiwan's cabinet spokesperson Sun Lih-chyun believed that "Malaysia sending the remaining Taiwanese suspects into China was due to the continuous "pressure from Beijing" that maintains all the suspects must be sent to Mainland China. Another 21 suspects were deported to China on 29 November, which also being done by Armenia earlier resulting in protests from Taiwanese citizens. Its Foreign Ministry expressed regret over the recent move and stern opposition to Malaysia's decision to deport Taiwanese to mainland China. In a statement, they said:

This action by Malaysia has seriously harmed the rights of our citizens and harms the long standing friendship between Taiwan and Malaysia.

== See also ==
- Malaysian Chinese
