= List of ambassadors of Malaysia to China =

Coordinates: 39.9524°N 116.4643°E

Ambassador of Malaysia to China
- Incumbent; Norman bin Muhamad since 8 November 2023
- Style: His Excellency
- Seat: Beijing
- Appointer: Yang di-Pertuan Agong
- Inaugural holder: Hashim Sultan
- Formation: January 1975
- Website: www.kln.gov.my/web/chn_beijing/home

The ambassador of Malaysia to the People's Republic of China is the head of Malaysia's diplomatic mission to China. The position has the rank and status of an ambassador extraordinary and plenipotentiary and is based in the Embassy of Malaysia, Beijing.

== List of heads of mission ==
=== Ambassadors to China ===
Ambassador	Term start	Term end
Hashim Sultan	January 1975	July 1977
Abdul Rahman Abdul Jalal	March 1978	January 1980
Albert Sixtus Talalla	April 1980	August 1983
Ahmad Kamil Jaafar	November 1983	April 1986
Ismail Mohamad	June 1986	December 1989
Noor Adlan Yahayauddin	December 1989	December 1994
Mat Amir Jaafar	August 1995	November 1997
Mohamed Abdul Majid Ahmad Khan	February 1998	January 2004
Norulzaman Kamarulzaman	February 2004	December 2009
Iskandar Sarudin	December 2009	December 2012
Zainuddin Yahya	January 2013	June 2019
Raja Nushirwan Zainal Abidin	18 July 2019	June 2023
Norman bin Muhamad	8 November 2023	Incumbent

== See also ==
- China–Malaysia relations
