= Cho Huan Lai Memorial =

Monument in Keningau, Malaysia

- Tugu Peringatan Cho Huan Lai
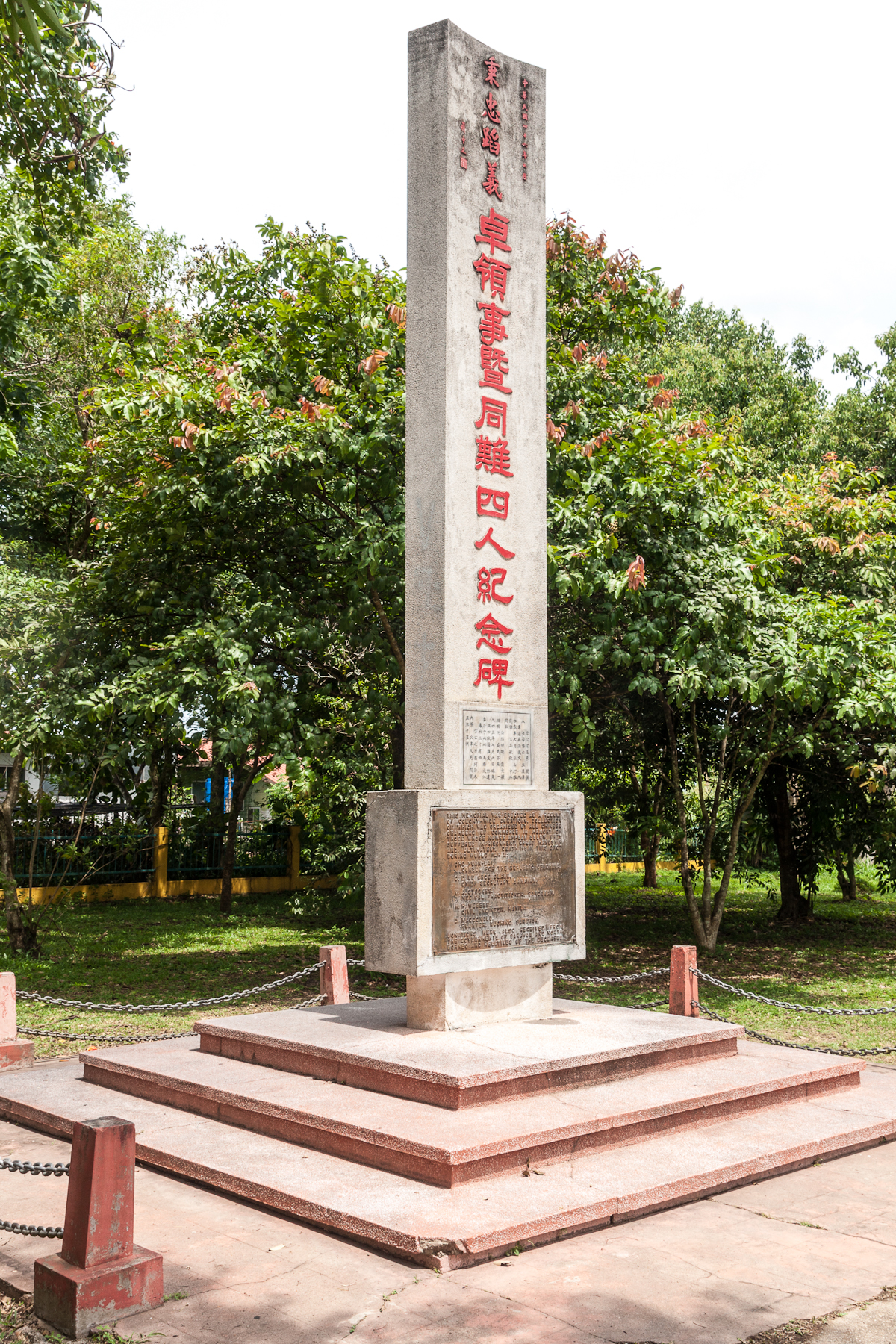
- The monument.
- Interactive map of Cho Huan Lai Memorial
- Location: Keningau
- Coordinates: 5°21′03″N 116°10′04″E
- Dedicated to: Cho Huan Lai and his several other colleagues

Cho Huan Lai Memorial or also known as Keningau War Memorial (Malay: Tugu Peringatan Cho Huan Lai, Tugu Peringatan Perang Keningau) in the Malaysian town of Keningau in Sabah is a monument dedicated to Chinese Consul General Cho Huan Lai and his colleagues who died on 6 July 1945 after being executed by the Japanese.

== History ==
When the Japanese invaded Sandakan on 19 January 1942, the Chinese Consulate was one of their first targets. Cho Huan Lai, who was the Chinese Consul General for the Republic of China in North Borneo since 1940 was arrested during the invasion. Shortly before the Japanese came to the consulate, Cho managed to destroy a number of consulate documents and other decipherment. Because of his diplomatic immunity, Cho along with several other Europeans was sent to an internment camp in Berhala Island before being moved together with his family to the Batu Lintang camp in Kuching. He used his connections to keep in contact with his outside inmates. But when the Japanese got to know about it, all of his inmates were arrested in May 1944 along with him. The Japanese military court sentenced them to imprisonment, for which they served their first period in a prison in Kuching, and later in Batu Tiga prison in Jesselton.

When the Allies launched an attack on the Japanese, some of his inmates were killed during an air raid on the prison in late 1944, while Cho was also wounded. In January 1945, the Japanese moved their prison to Beaufort and on 12 April 1945, it was moved to Keningau. After another series of bombings on other prisons, all prisoners was taken to Bulu Silau, which lies about two miles from Keningau. In Keningau, Cho came under the command of Lt. Col. Abe Keichi, the Japanese military commander of Keningau, and Lieutenant Akutagawa Mitsuya, the commander of the local kenpeitai. On 5 July, the Japanese planned to release them because they had fully served the sentence.

Since none of them were still alive at the end of the war, inquiries were made as to what had happened to them. It turned out that the men had been taken to an airfield in Keningau under the pretext of relocation to Ranau and located near the airfield (about two miles from the Japanese General Lieutenant Abe's headquarters) where they had been executed on 6 July 1945. After the war, the British government was keen to learn the exact locations of the remains of Cho and his European companions. The plan was supported and conducted by Richard Evans, the former resident of the West Coast Division. In October 1945, his search led him to Keningau where he discovered the graves of Cho, Stokes and others. Although the Japanese Commander, Abe Keichi, and Lieutenant Akutagawa Mitsuya denied their role in the execution of Cho, both of them were found guilty and sentenced to death by hanging. The sentence was carried out in Changi Prison in Singapore. The remains of Cho and his colleagues were later reburied at the old Anglican Cemetery of Jesselton.

=== Recent diplomatic visits ===
On 29 July 2017, the Taiwanese Deputy Representative Michael S.Y. Yiin and their delegates together with Malaysia's member of parliament (MP) for Keningau district, Joseph Pairin Kitingan visited the memorial in conjunction with its 72nd anniversary.

== Location ==
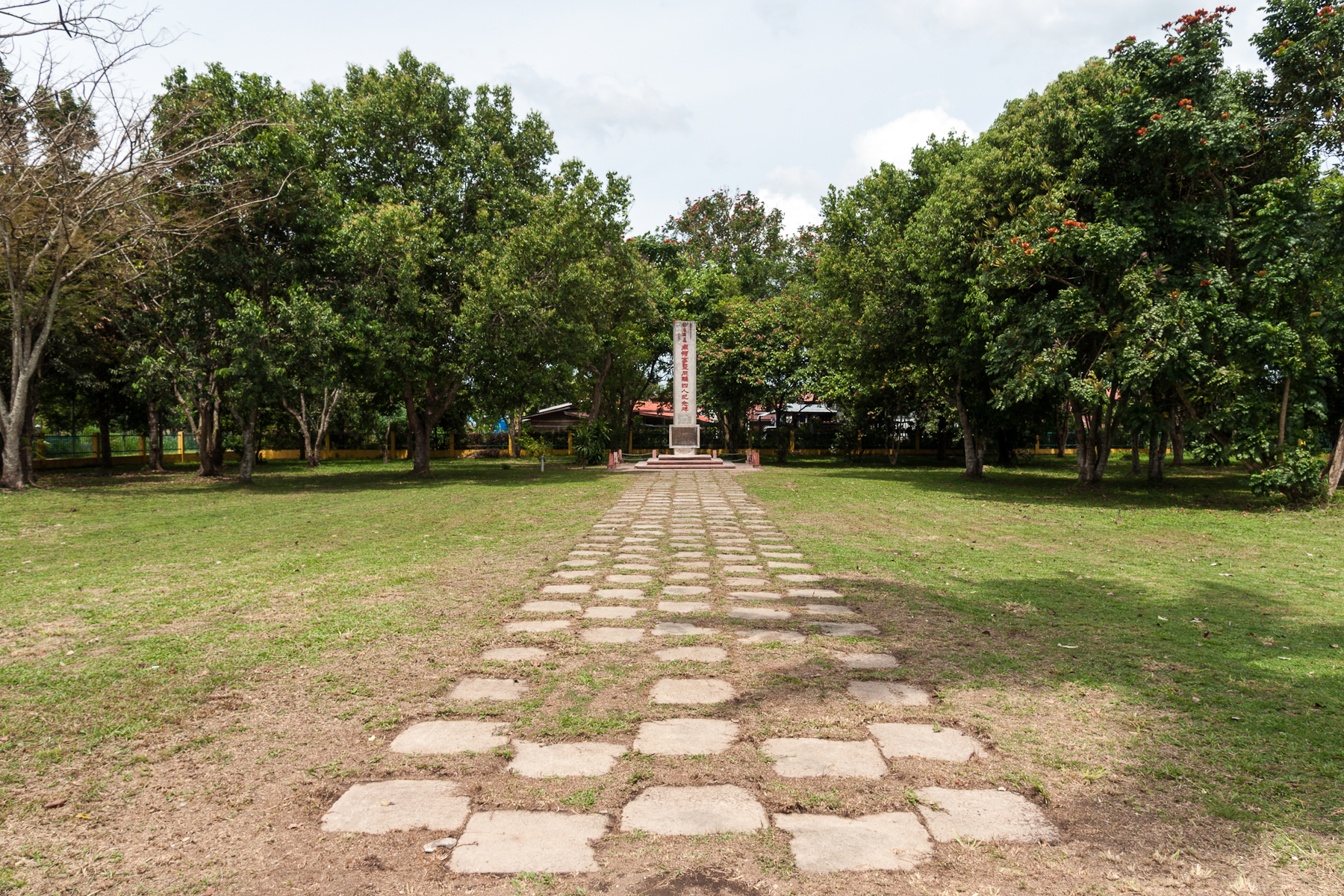
Park at the memorial.

The monument is located near the former airfield of Keningau where Cho and his colleagues been executed.

The monument is shaped like a towering stele of about 4 metres in height. The cross section is rectangular; the entrance facing the wider side with red ancient Chinese character given a slightly concave. At the bottom of the monument is a slightly wider rectangular block with bronze plate, which described the information in English. The monument is placed on a three-tiered, square stepped pedestal.

The memorial inscription in large red ancient Chinese characters translated as:

"Monument to Cho, Consul, and his four colleagues"

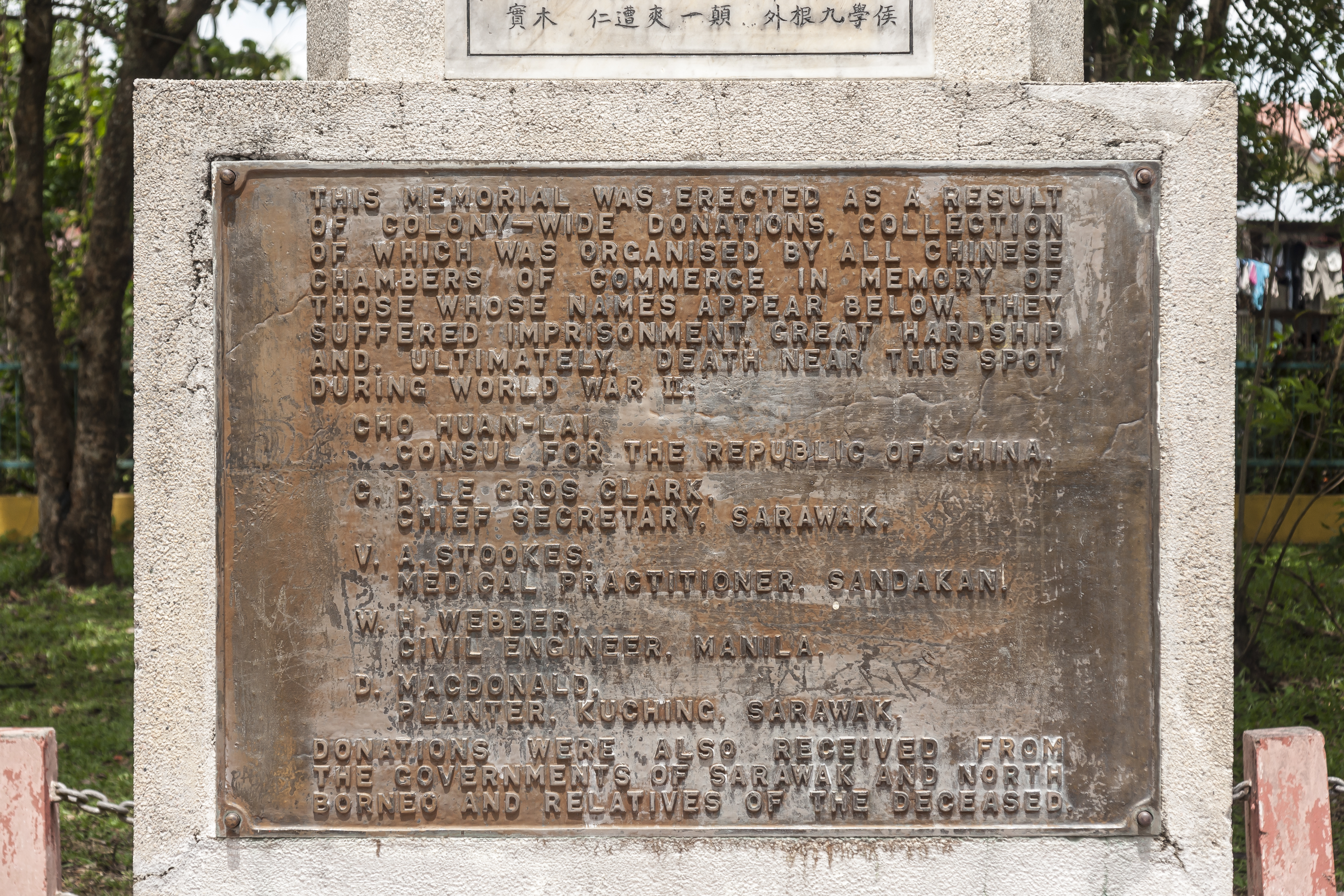
The English language bronze plaque.

The bronze plaque listed the names of the people executed here, namely:

- Cho Huan Lai – Consul General of the Republic of China.
- Cyril Drummond Le Gros Clark – Chief Secretary of the Rajah of Sarawak.
- Valentine A. Stokes – Medical practitioner, Sandakan.
- Henry William Webber – Engineer, Manila.
- Donald Macdonald – Planter, Kuching, Sarawak.

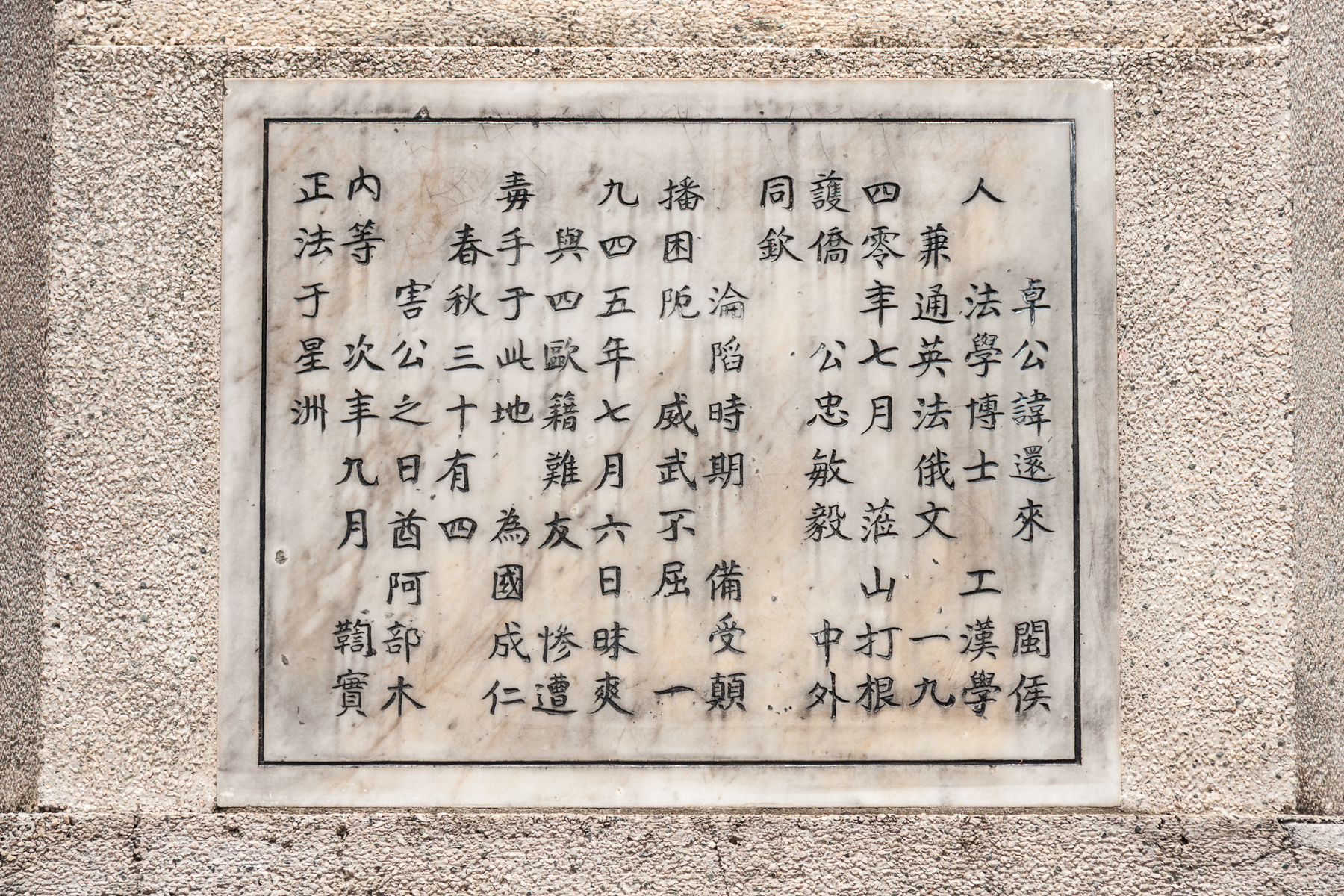
A Chinese language marble slab.

Above the English language bronze plaque is a marble slab inserted into the monument with an inscription in Chinese language:

Cho Huan-Lai from Nak Hou, with a French PhD in engineering, able to speak English, French and Russian, arrived in Sandakan in July 1940 to support the local Chinese. He served the authorities loyally and was respected by locals and foreigners. During the war he was arrested on false accusations, but never yielded to his captors. On 6 July 1945 at the age of 33, he and his four other European friends were cruelly executed on this spot. The responsible Japanese officer was tried and convicted in September the following year in Singapore.
