= Agop Batu Tulug Caves =

Caves in Sabah, Malaysia

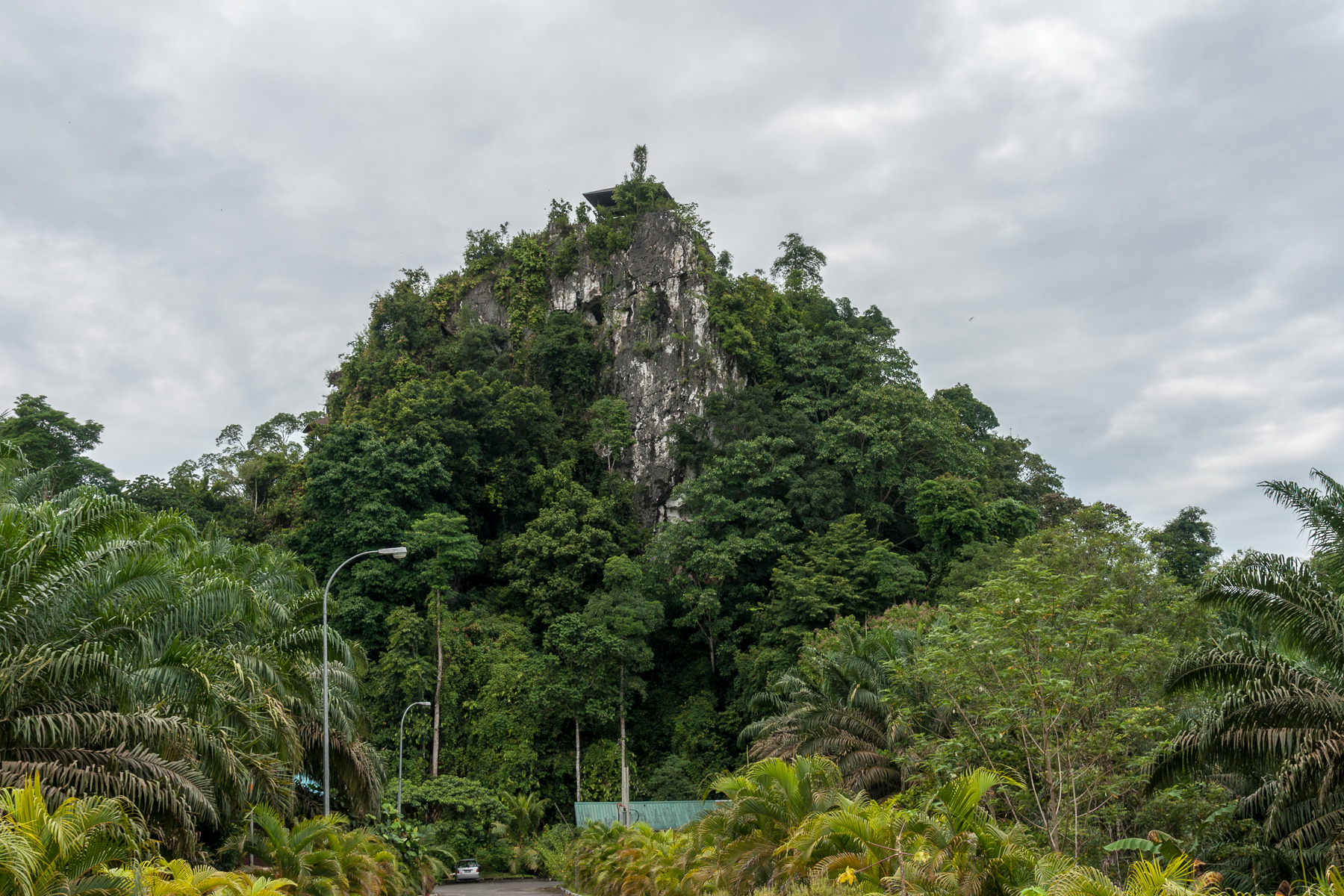
- The limestone cliffs seen from outside which also the main gate to the caves.
- Interactive map of Agop Batu Tulug Caves
- Coordinates: 5°24′58.2″N 117°56′31.8″E
- Discovery: 1984
- Entrances: 1

Agop Batu Tulug Caves is an archaeological site in the Malaysian state of Sabah and refers to a group of several caves in a steep limestone cliffs in the Kinabatangan district.

== Etymology ==
The name combines words from three languages: agop in Sungai language means "cave", batu is the Malay word for "rock", while tulug comes from the Cebuano language (carrying the same meaning as in the Sungai language) where it means "to go to sleep" referring to the resting place of the dead.

== History ==
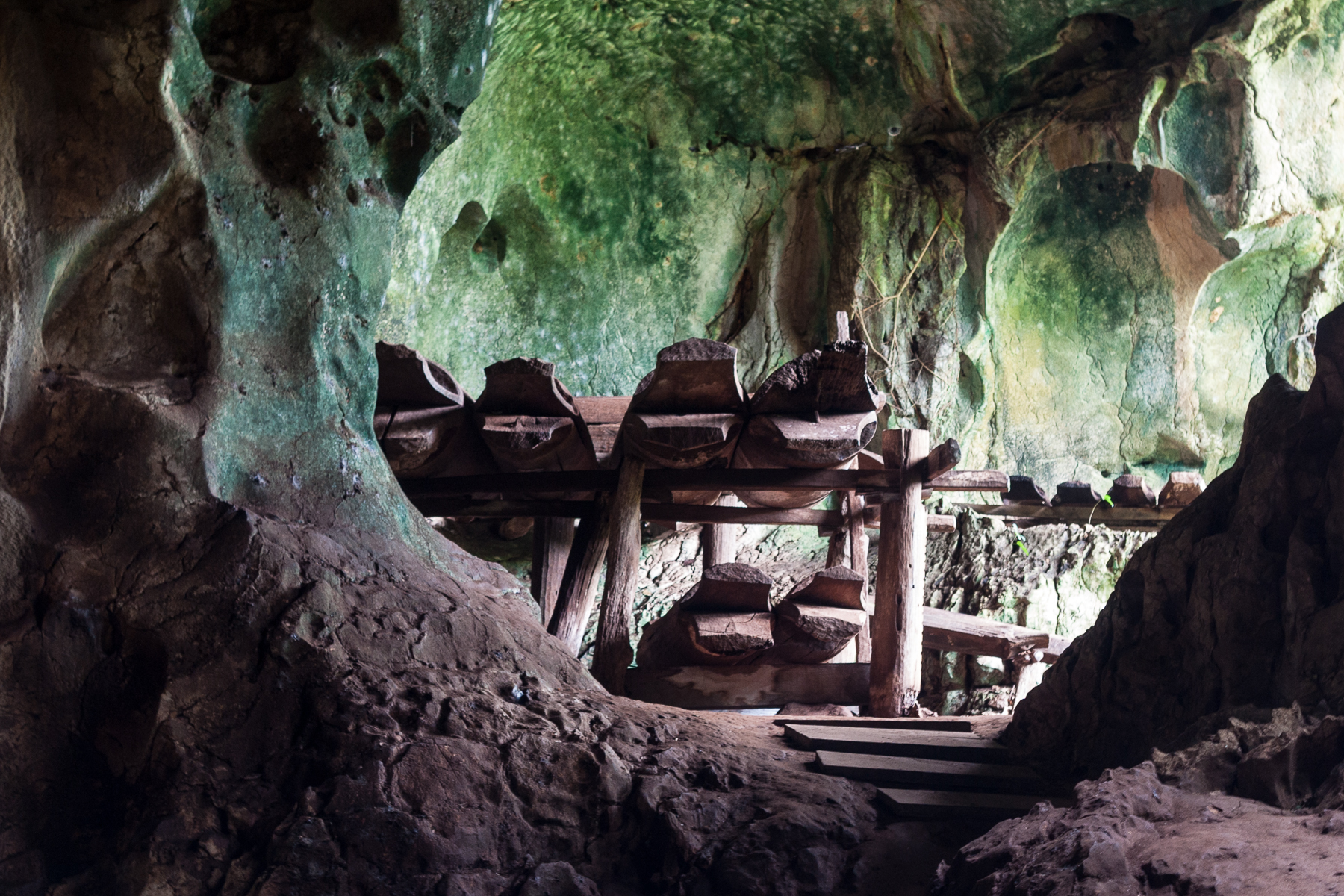
The wooden coffins.

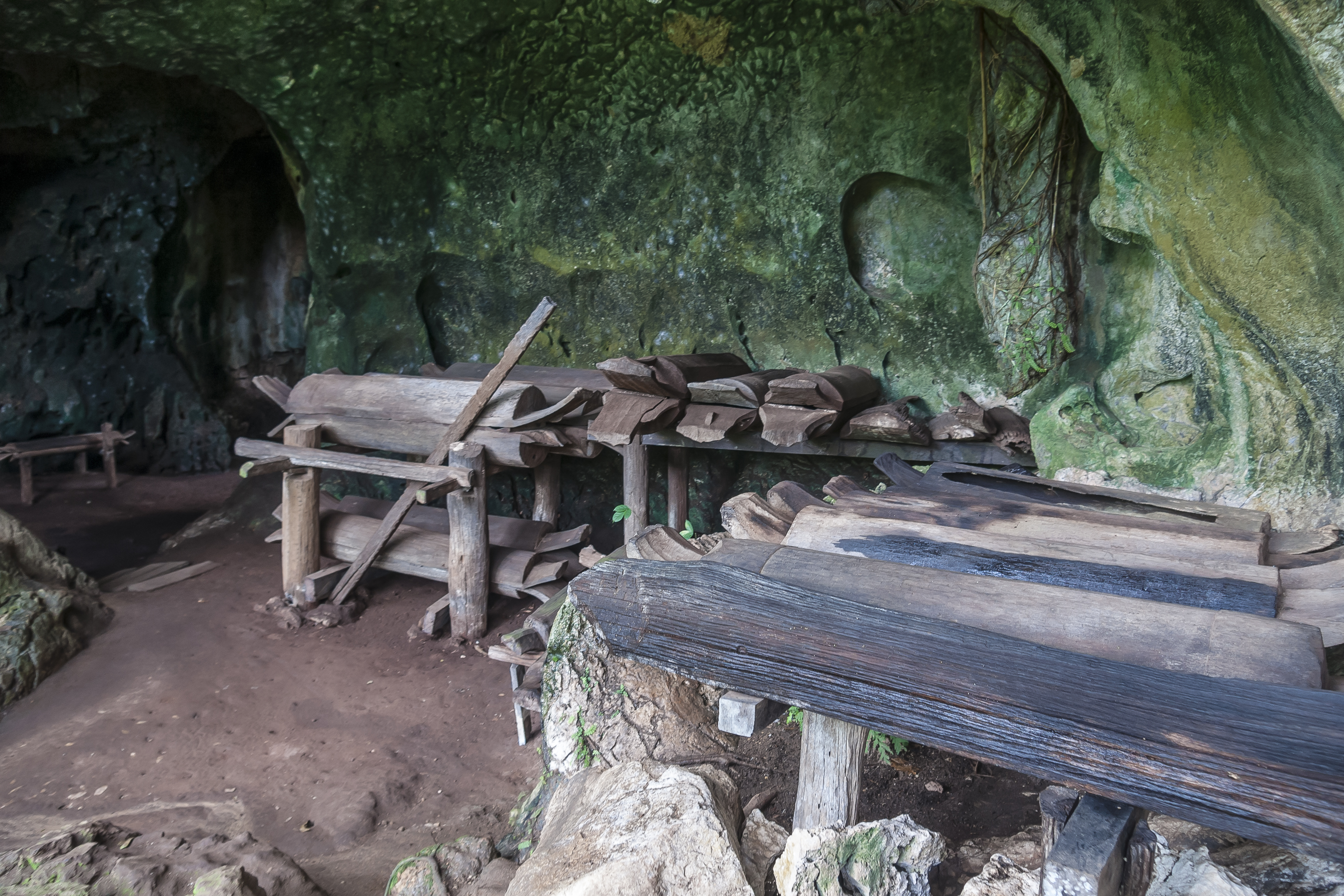
Several wooden coffins in the upper cave.

The caves were used 500 to 900 years ago as a burial place with about 125 carved wooden coffins inside. It was divided into three main caves: Agop Sawat (upper cave), Agop Lintanga (middle cave) and Agop Suriba (lower cave). The caves at Agop Sawat and Lintanga contained more than 125 ancient log coffins. All coffins inside the caves were made from belian (Eusideroxylon zwageri) hardwood, and decorated with carvings of buffalo head, crocodile, house lizard and snake.

The carvings reflect the myths and legends of the Kinabatangan people. For example, a crocodile is related to death and the power darkness, while the bugang bird, dog, rooster and deer were friends of their heroes. The coffins resemble different animals associated to the beliefs of the Orang Sungai but it has also been suggested that they are the coffins of the Chinese who once settled in the area, because Chinese artifacts were found among the remains.

It is believed that this type of funeral culture was brought by traders from mainland China and Indochina to northern Borneo, since similar wooden coffins were also discovered in these countries. Researchers assumes that about 2,000 such wooden coffins are distributed in the Kinabatangan Valley. Other sites are located in Ulu Segama, Lahad Datu and Tawau.

The cave was discovered in 1984 through an expedition led by P Brietag, the manager of tobacco estate in Batu Putih of Kinabatangan together with researcher Barbara Harrisson of Sarawak State Museum, along with staff from the Sabah Museum. Since 6 July 1996, the caves have been part of the Sabah Museum, responsible for maintenance and upkeep of the ancillary facilities such as toilets, staircase buildings, office buildings and overnight cabins, not to include the scientific support of the caves.
