= Hong Kong–Malaysia relations =

- Hong Kong: Malaysia

Diplomatic mission
- Hong Kong Economic and Trade Office (Jakarta): Consulate-General of Malaysia, Hong Kong

Hong Kong–Malaysia relations refers to bilateral diplomatic relations between Hong Kong and Malaysia.

Hong Kong enjoys significant autonomy in economic, trade, financial and monetary matters, Both regions were colonized by the British Empire. Malaysia maintains a consulate general office in Hong Kong.

== Diplomatic representation ==
As a Special Administrative Region of the People's Republic of China, Hong Kong is formally represented in Malaysia by the Chinese Embassy in Kuala Lumpur. Hong Kong's trade relations with Malaysia are handled by the Hong Kong Trade and Development Council in Kuala Lumpur. Malaysia did not establish diplomatic relations with the People's Republic of China until 31 May 1974.

Malaysia has a Consulate General in Wan Chai. This was established on 2 July 1971. As Hong Kong was then under British rule, this was then known as a Commission, as were the missions of some other Commonwealth countries. Following the transfer of sovereignty in 1997, the commission was renamed the Consulate General, and the last Commissioner became Consul-General. The current Consul-General of Malaysia in Hong Kong is Yap Wei Sin who took up the post in March 2019.

== Economic relations ==
In 2010, Malaysia became the 10th largest trading partner for Hong Kong with the total trade increased from HK$87.2 billion in 2009 to HK$110.5 billion. These total trade was later increase to $14.65 billion in 2013. Malaysia also became one of the 18th largest investors into Hong Kong in 2009, with an Inward Direct Investment (IDI) stock of HK$16.5 billion, while Hong Kong investment to Malaysia worth to HK$43.9 billion.

In 2010, Hong Kong became the third largest foreign direct investment (FDI) in Malaysia with a total investments of RM2.77 billion in 11 projects comprising nine new projects and other two expansion/diversification projects. There are 7 regional headquarters, 19 regional offices and 33 local offices which been set up by the Malaysian companies in Hong Kong. An agreement on double tax avoidance and prevention of fiscal evasion was signed in 2012.

== Medical tourism ==
As of 2012, the number of visitors from China (including Hong Kong) to Malaysia for medical treatment has doubled, from 7,500 in 2010 to 15,000.
