= Malaysian Friendship and Trade Centre, Taipei =

Malaysian Friendship and Trade Centre, Taipei Pusat Persahabatan dan Perdagangan Malaysia, Taipei
- 馬來西亞友誼及貿易中心

Agency overview
- Formed: 1983 (as Friendship and Trade Exchange Centre); 1987 (as Malaysian Friendship and Trade Centre)
- Jurisdiction: Republic of China (Taiwan)
- Headquarters: Songshan, Taipei, Taiwan
- Agency executive: Aznifah Isnariah Abdul Ghani, President
- Website: Malaysian Friendship and Trade Centre, Taipei

The Malaysian Friendship and Trade Centre, Taipei (Malay: Pusat Persahabatan dan Perdagangan Malaysia, Taipei; Chinese: 馬來西亞友誼及貿易中心; pinyin: Mǎláixīyà Yǒuyì Jí Màoyì Zhōngxīn) is the representative office of Malaysia in Taiwan in the absence of diplomatic relations.

In 1974, Malaysia established diplomatic relations with the People's Republic of China, leading to the closure of the Malaysian Consulate-General in Taipei. An office of Malaysia Airlines in Taipei represented Malaysia's interests in Taiwan until 1982. In 1983, a Trade Office was opened, leading to the establishment of the Friendship and Trade Exchange Centre, before it adopted its present name in 1987.

Its counterpart body in Malaysia is the Taipei Economic and Cultural Office in Malaysia in Kuala Lumpur.

== See also ==
- Malaysia–Taiwan relations
- List of diplomatic missions in Taiwan
- List of diplomatic missions of Malaysia
