= Chinese Taipei School Kuala Lumpur =

School in Petaling, Selangor, Malaysia

- 吉隆坡臺灣學校 吉隆坡台湾学校
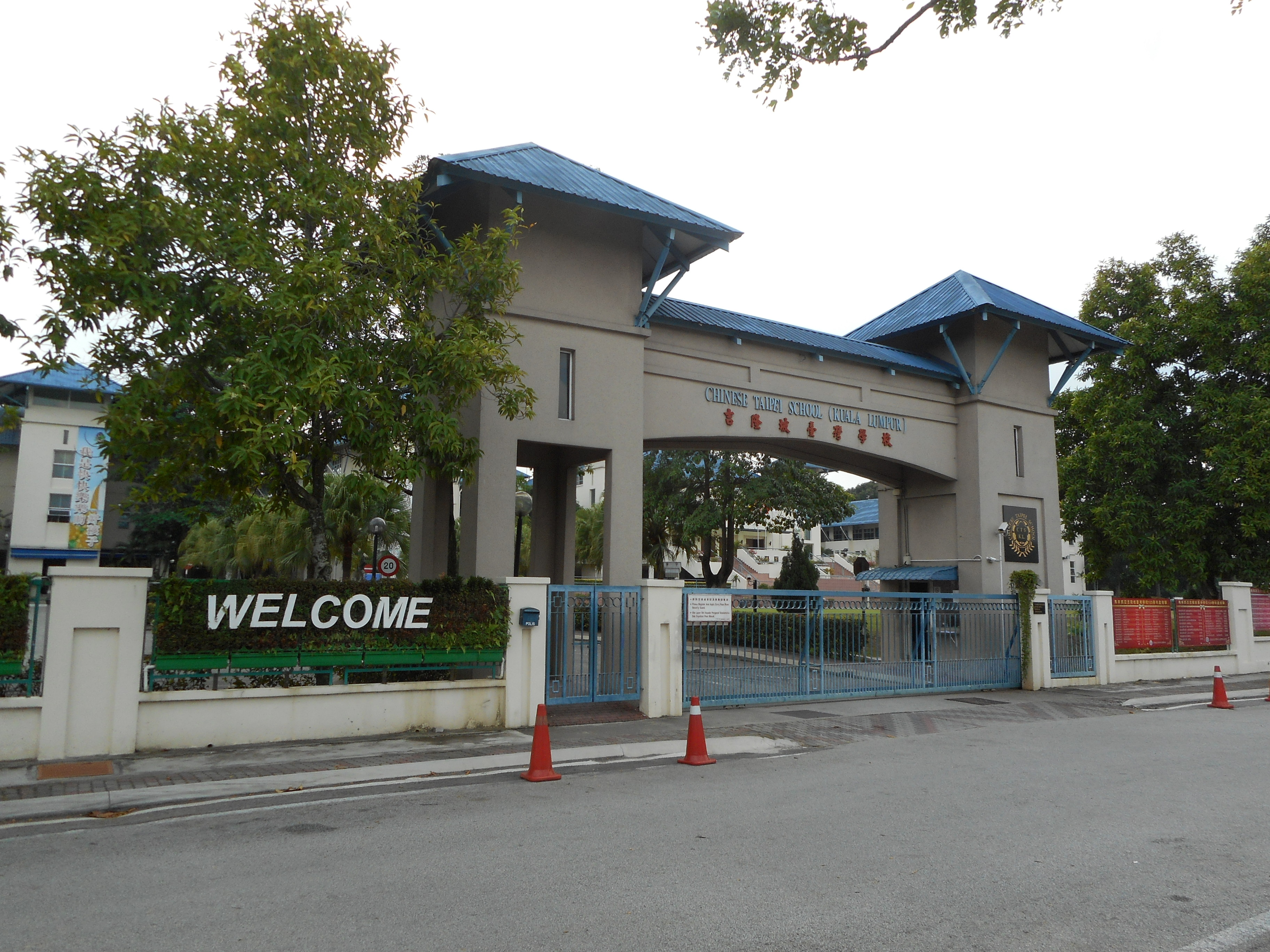

Location
- No.1, Persiaran Sungai Selangor, Bukit Rimau, Seksyen 32, 40460 Shah Alam, Selangor. MALAYSIA
- Coordinates: 2°59′49.2″N 101°31′39.6″E

Information
- Type: Private, international school
- Established: 13 April 1992
- Website: cts.edu.my

Chinese Taipei School Kuala Lumpur
- Traditional Chinese: 吉隆坡臺灣學校
- Simplified Chinese: 吉隆坡台湾学校
- Literal meaning: Kuala Lumpur Taiwan School
Transcriptions
Standard Mandarin
- Hanyu Pinyin: Jílóngpō Táiwān Xuéxiào
- Wade–Giles: Chi-lung-p'o T'ai-wan Hsüeh-hsiao

Alternative Chinese name
- Traditional Chinese: 吉隆坡中華台北學校
- Simplified Chinese: 吉隆坡中华台北学校
- Literal meaning: Chinese Taipei School Kuala Lumpur
Transcriptions
Standard Mandarin
- Hanyu Pinyin: Jílóngpō Zhōnghuá Táiběi Xuéxiào
- Wade–Giles: Chi-lung-p'o Chung-hua T'ai-pei Hsüeh-hsiao

Chinese Taipei School Kuala Lumpur (CTSKL, traditional Chinese: 吉隆坡臺灣學校; simplified Chinese: 吉隆坡台湾学校 - Former Chinese name: 吉隆坡中華台北學校; 吉隆坡中华台北学校) is a Taiwanese (Republic of China) international school in Shah Alam, Selangor, Malaysia.

It was established on 13 April 1992, and includes dormitory facilities. The school provides English and Malay classes.

It serves levels kindergarten through senior high school.

As of 2016 it has 35 teachers, 115 ROC national students, and 135 students of other nationalities.

== See also ==
- Malaysia–Taiwan relations
- List of schools in Selangor
