= Taipei Economic and Cultural Office, Kuala Lumpur =

Representative office of the Republic of China in Malaysia

Taipei Economic and Cultural Office in Malaysia 馬來西亞台北經濟文化辦事處
- Pejabat Ekonomi dan Kebudayaan Taipei

Agency overview
- Formed: 1974 (as Far East Travel and Trade Centre); 1988 (as Taipei Economic and Cultural Centre); 1992 (as Taipei Economic and Cultural Office in Malaysia)
- Jurisdiction: Malaysia; Pakistan
- Headquarters: Kuala Lumpur
- Agency executive: Vivian Lien, Representative
- Website: Taipei Economic and Cultural Office in Malaysia

The Taipei Economic and Cultural Office in Malaysia (Chinese: 馬來西亞台北經濟文化辦事處; pinyin: Zhù Mǎláixīyà Táiběi Jīngjì Wénhuà Bànshì Chù) (Malay: Pejabat Ekonomi dan Kebudayaan Taipei) is the representative office of Taiwan in Malaysia, which functions as a de facto embassy in the absence of diplomatic relations.

Its counterpart body in Taiwan is the Malaysian Friendship and Trade Centre in Taipei.

== History ==
The office was established in 1974 as the Far East Travel and Trade Centre. Until that year, Taiwan, as the Republic of China, had a Consulate-General in Kuala Lumpur. This had previously been established as a Consulate in 1964, before being upgraded to a Consulate-General five years later.

However, this was closed after Malaysia established full diplomatic relations with the People's Republic of China. The office was upgraded in 1988, and renamed the Taipei Economic and Cultural Centre. It adopted its present name in 1992.

== See also ==
- Malaysia–Taiwan relations
- List of diplomatic missions of Taiwan
- Taipei Economic and Cultural Representative Office
