= Chinese Taipei School Penang =

Former school in Central Seberang Perai, Penang, Malaysia

- 檳吉臺灣學校 槟吉台湾学校

Location
- NO. 49, Lorong Kurau Satu, Taman Chai Leng, 13700 Perai, Seberang Perai, Penang, Malaysia
- Coordinates: 5°23′21.9″N 100°23′43.4″E

Information
- Type: Private, international school
- Website: ctsp.edu.my

Chinese Taipei School Penang
- Traditional Chinese: 檳吉臺灣學校
- Simplified Chinese: 槟吉台湾学校
Transcriptions
Standard Mandarin
- Hanyu Pinyin: Bīngjí Táiwān Xuéxiào
- Wade–Giles: Ping-chi T'ai-wan Hsüeh-hsiao

Chinese Taipei School Penang (CTSP; traditional Chinese: 檳吉臺灣學校; simplified Chinese: 槟吉台湾学校) was a Taiwanese (Republic of China) international school in Penang, Malaysia.

The school, which serves levels elementary through senior high school, was first established on 25 February 1995. It is the first Overseas Taiwan School. The current school was established on 1 August 2005 in place of the Penang Taiwan School/Penang Tai Chiao School due to administration issues in the former school. As of 2016 it has 30 teachers, 135 ROC national students, and 10 students of other nationalities. This school has closed for now.
