= British North Borneo Company's Medal =

British North Borneo Company's Medal were medals awarded by the British North Borneo Company, and may refer to:

- Punitive Expedition Medal, for the 1897 expedition
- Punitive Expeditions Medal, for expeditions 1898 afterward
- Tambunan Expedition Medal, for the 1900 expedition
