= John Bartholomew Atkinson =

North Borneo Police Commissioner (1907–1987)

John Bartholomew Atkinson CBE
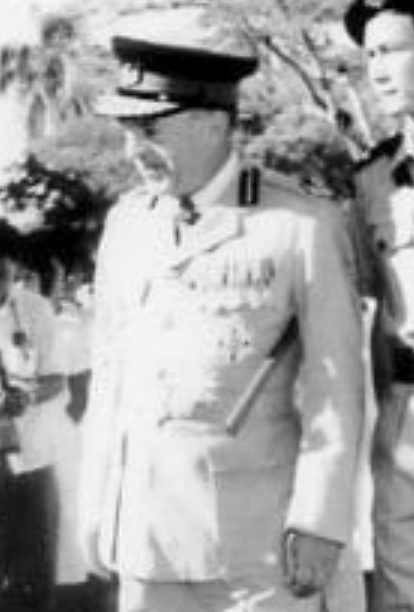

Commissioner of the North Borneo Police Force
- In office 1950–1960
- Governor: Herbert Ralph Hone
- Preceded by: Self, as Commandant
- Succeeded by: Donald Matheson

Commandant of the North Borneo Armed Constabulary
- In office 1947–1950
- Governor: Edward Francis Twining; James Calder
- Preceded by: Lionel Matthews; Alan Rice-Oxley
- Succeeded by: Self, as Commissioner

Personal details
- Born: 4 July 1907 Kent, England
- Died: June 1987 (aged 79) Tunbridge Wells, Kent, England
- Spouse(s): Unknown name, married 1936, listed only as "Mrs. Atkinson."
- Parent: ?
- Awards

Military service
- Branch/service: North Borneo Armed Constabulary
- Rank: Captain
- Battles/wars: World War II (POW)

John Bartholomew Atkinson was a British police officer who served as the Commissioner of the North Borneo Police Force. He was also a founding member of the St John Ambulance Brigade in Borneo (today the St. John Ambulance Brigade in Malaysia), and later served as the President of the Ware Ambulance Division of the St. John Ambulance Brigade.

== Biography ==
=== North Borneo Armed Constabulary ===
John Bartholomew Atkinson first appears in the historical record on 12 April 1929 with P. N. Claridge aboard the Straits Steamship Company steamer SS Kamuning as it arrived in the harbor of Jesselton, the capital city of North Borneo (present day Sabah). After being recruited for service in the government by agents of the North Borneo Chartered Company in England, Atkinston had sat for interviews at "The Company's" headquarters at 7 Threadneedle Street, City of London, prior to his trip to Southeast Asia. The Company, having a royal charter since 1881, was the sole governing authority over the entire country of North Borneo, a place roughly the size of Northern Ireland. Disembarking the steamer in Jesselton, Atkinson and Claridge were officially entered into the Cadet Service of North Borneo – Claridge then went into the country's Civil Service on track to become a Resident, but Atkinson was sent to become an officer of the North Borneo Armed Constabulary.

The Armed Constabulary served a dual function as the country's only military and police force, whose officers and constables were tasked both with routine police work in its towns and cities, but also with military actions against enemies of the state. By 1929, however, the country had not had a major punitive expedition in over 13 years, with the Rundum Rebellion being the last major uprising against Colonial rule. Going into the new decade, the role of the Constabulary was shifting to become more of a police force – but anti-piracy still occupied much of its focus.

In 1934, Atkinson was sent to the Police Depot in Kuala Lumpur for three months for a ”special course of training.” He returned to North Borneo in November.

In the summer of 1935, Atkinson was appointed Assistant Superintendent of the Constabulary, and Chief Police Officer (CPO) of the Sandakan Police Station, being the commander of that city's police, reporting directly to the Commandant of the Constabulary.

In January 1935, Atkinson was appointed the CPO of the Jesselton Police Station.

He was married in November 1936.

=== World War II ===
When the Japanese invaded North Borneo during the Malayan campaign, the government was ordered by the Chartered Company to surrender the country and lay down arms. During the Japanese occupation of British Borneo, Atkinson, as a member of the Constabulary, was interred as a prisoner of war. He was interred at Jesselton from 16 May 1942 to 5 September 1942. He was then transferred to Batu Lintang camp, and remained there until the camp was liberated by the 9th Australian Division.

=== Commandant and Commissioner ===
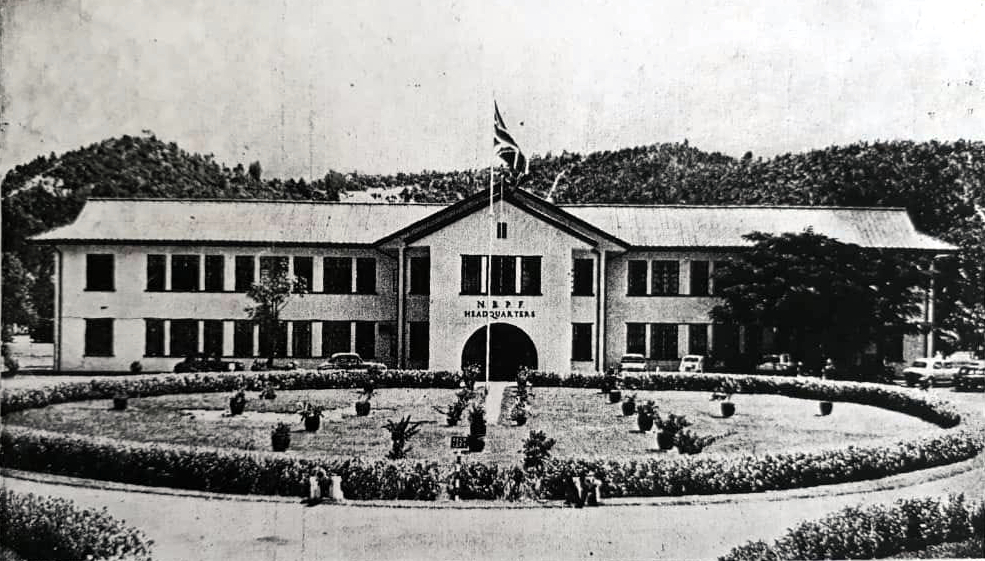
The North Borneo Police Force Headquarters at Marina Barracks were opened on 10 October 1952, inaugurated by the Duchess of Kent.

After the war, the Company went into insolvency and could not maintain the governance over North Borneo, at which point, the country was made the Crown Colony of North Borneo. Now under the crown, the Constabulary became a member of the Colonial Police Service and began its process of standardizing tactics and training with the other police forces in the British Empire. In 1947, Atkinson was appointed as the Commandant of the North Borneo Armed Constabulary. Here, he was responsible for the entire organization, reporting directly to the Governor of North Borneo, Edward Twining.

On 1 January 1950, the Constabulary was renamed the North Borneo Police Force, and Atkinson was now called the Commissioner of the North Borneo Police Force, with the newly organized force now no longer considered primarily military in function, but primarily a police agency.

In 1950, he was awarded the King's Police and Fire Services Medal.

In April 1951, Atkinson attended the first ever British Colonial Police Commissioners' Conference in history, presided over by Sir Charles Joseph Jeffries and the Colonial Police Service. At this conference, police commissioners from every country and colony in the British Empire arrived at the National Police College in Ryton-on-Dunsmore, Warwickshire to discuss the complexity of the modern British Empire in a postwar world. Opening keynotes were delivered by Percy Sillitoe and Nevil Brownjohn. After getting settled into his lodgings for the conference, Atkinson travelled with Colonel William Nicol Gray and Duncan Macintosh, the police commissioners of Sarawak and Hong Kong, to London to meet with John Dugdale, the Minister of State at the Colonial Office. Later that week, Atkinson and the rest of the commissioners met with George VI and Queen Elizabeth the Queen Mother. In July, the commissioners then went to Hyde Park, London for a Royal review of the Colonial Police forces.

In 1959, he was made a Commander of the British Empire.

In 1952, at an investiture performed by Governor Horne, Atkinson was awarded the rank of a Serving Brother of the Order of St. John.

=== Return to England ===
58 years after the founding of the Ware ambulance division of the St John Ambulance Brigade, Atkinson was appointed by T. Forbes, the county superintendent, as its first-serving President, and was presented with the President's Badge at Ware Priory on 6 May 1960. In a newspaper announcement for this appointment, it is written that he had "recently returned from Borneo."

Around this time, he lived in Greenways, Wilford.

In 1963, after Sabah declared independence, Atkinson gave a talk on Borneo to a combined meeting of Bishop's Stortford and Ware Round Tables at Long's Restaurant in Bishop's Stortford. He presented colour photographs. He gave the same talk in 1973 and 1976.
