= William James Foley =

British colonial police officer (1857–1936)

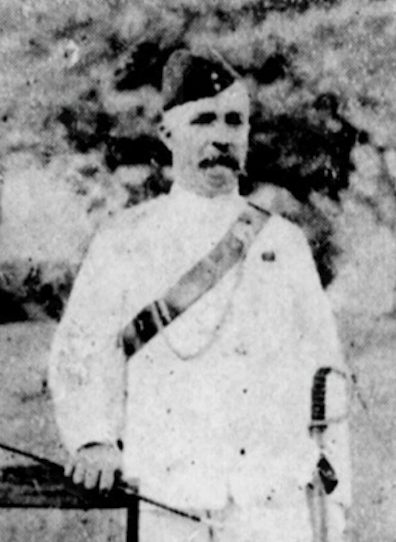

Chief Inspector of Penang Tramways
- In office ?–?

Chief Inspector of the Federated Malay States Police
- In office ?–1905

Officer in Charge of Gopeng Police District
- In office ?–1891

Acting Commandant of the British North Borneo Constabulary
- In office 1882 – 17 July 1883

Chief Inspector at Kudat Police Station
- In office 14 December 1881 – 1882
- Appointed by: Arthur Montgomery Harington
- Governor: William Hood Treacher

Personal details
- Born: 17 August 1857 Madras, British Raj
- Died: 13 August 1936 (aged 78) Penang, Straits Settlements
- Spouses: Alice Nicholson (died 1898); Philomena Magdalene Peterson
- Parent: Michael Foley
- Education: St. Xavier's Institution

Military service
- Branch/service: Royal Artillery; Straits Settlements Police Force; British North Borneo Constabulary; First Battalion Perak Sikhs; Federated Malay States Police; Singapore Police Force
- Battles/wars: Perak War; Second Pahang Rebellion

William James Foley was a British colonial police officer. He served as a high-ranking police officer in several British colonial police forces throughout Southeast Asia. In 1883, he served as the Acting Commandant of the British North Borneo Constabulary. He also served as a Chief Inspector of the Federated Malay States Police (FMSP), and as Chief Inspector of the Penang Tramways. In the 1930s, he was often called "the oldest living European in British Malaya."

== Biography ==
=== Early life ===
Foley's father was Michael Foley, an Irishman from County Cork who joined the Madras Artillery and discharged at the British Raj. Michael Foley served for some time in his later career as a drill instructor at St. Thomas' Mount, Madras. One of the elder Foley's students at the drill house was John Frederick Adolphus McNair, who later served as Lieutenant Governor of Penang.

When he was fourteen, in 1871, Foley was sent from the Andaman Islands to be educated at the St. Xavier's Institution, run by the De La Salle Brothers in British Penang.

=== Military service ===
In September 1873, at the age of 16, he joined the Royal Artillery Garrison Detachment at Penang. In March 1874, the Artillery detachment was transferred to British Singapore, where Foley lived for a year before the breakout of the Perak War.

When the Perak War broke out, Foley was among the first batch of soldiers sent to Perak from Singapore to fight there, where he served as an escort to the Battery Major. Foley was deployed first to Teluk Anson, and then up to Banda Bahru, sailing with the 1st and 3rd detachments of the Royal Artillery and Engineers and several detachments of Indian soldiers. They sailed with a brigade of the Royal Navy and the gunboats HMS Charybdis and HMS Hart.

Foley returned to Singapore in March 1876. He was awarded the Perak War Medal with clasp.

In March 1877, Foley was ordered with his unit to England, and took a 77 day voyage aboard the HMS Himalaya.

On 8 January 1879, Foley left Liverpool with a different military detachment aboard the Blue Funnel Line steamship Diomed. They arrived at Singapore in February.

=== Straits Settlements Police Force ===
Soon after arriving in Singapore, at the insistence of Samuel Dunlop, Inspector General of Police, Foley was seconded to the service of the Straits Settlements Police Force (SSPF). He was technically still a member of the Royal Artillery, so for several months he earned double-pay, and daily rations from the Royal Army, until his official discharge from the military in December 1879.

In the early part of 1880, a beriberi epidemic broke out at the Singapore Criminal Prison, and Foley was made the Police Officer in Charge (OIC) of the Police Guard overseeing the transfer of 150 convicts from Singapore to Penang Prison. During the trip, there were several incidents that made Foley consider his life. After this trip, and only fifteen months in the service of the SSPF, Foley resigned his commission due to what he reasoned was too small of a salary for his needs.

=== British North Borneo Constabulary ===
In 1881, a new country called North Borneo was established at the north eastern tip of the island of Borneo, roughly the size of Northern Ireland. This was an entire country wholly owned and operated by the North Borneo Chartered Company. The sole military and police force of that new country was called the British North Borneo Constabulary, and the first-serving Commandant of the British North Borneo Constabulary, Arthur Montgomery Harington, spent much of 1881 outside of North Borneo recruiting for the new service.

Foley was recruited into the British North Borneo Constabulary some time in 1881, and was officially commissioned into the service of North Borneo on 14 December 1881. His first assignment was as Chief Inspector, stationed at Kudat, the first capital city of North Borneo.

In 1882, Commandant Harington resigned his commission as Commandant, and Foley became Acting Commandant of the Constabulary.

In 1883, Foley returned to Singapore. He re-joined the government service there as a Court usher in the Singapore Police Court.

=== Perak Sikhs and Federated Malay States Police ===
In 1885, during the course of events surrounding the Panjeh Incident, Russia and the British Empire were prepared to go to war in South Asia. Charles Phillips, Superintendent of the Singapore Sailors' Home, assembled the Eurasian Volunteers Company, and Foley was the first European volunteer in that company.

On November 12, 1885, Foley joined the First Battalion of the Perak Sikhs (later known as the Federated Malay States Police). As a member of the Perak Sikhs, Foley fought in the Second Pahang Rebellion. Foley was selected by Major Robert Sandilands Frowd Walker to join an expedition and search the countryside for rebels in hiding.

In 1887, Foley was put onto "cholera duty," to support the civil service during an outbreak of cholera in the Larut District. After this mission, Governor Frederick Aloysius Weld promoted Foley to the rank of First Class Inspector.

In November 1887, while he was stationed in Taiping, Foley was deployed on special assignment to suppress rioting in the Kinta District.

Sometime later, Foley was sent on another special assignment to Gopeng. The night after he arrived, he arrested the leader of the Ghee Hin Kongsi. After this, his superiors urged that he remain in Gopeng and take charge of the Police District there. Here, he organized the Fire Brigade and several sanitation projects. According to his commandant, under Foley's tenure, the village of Papan was transformed from "from the most insanitary, to the best kept village in the Kinta district."

In 1891, Foley was transferred again from Kinta back to Larut.

=== Retirement from FMSP and move to Penang ===
In 1905, Foley retired from the Federated Malay States Police as Senior Chief Inspector.

In retirement, Foley went to work at several rubber estates. He served as a manager and an acting manager.

When World War I broke out, Foley volunteered to fight, but he was denied entry into the service due to his age. On 10 August 1915, Foley's first son, Michael James Aloysius Foley, who was a Captain in the Middlesex Regiment, and fought in the Dardanelles, died at the Gallipoli campaign. His fourth son, Alfred James, also fought in the war.

At some point, Foley moved to Penang, where he joined the Municipal Government of Penang. He served as the Chief Inspector for Penang Tramways, and as the Municipal Overseer for Drains and Bridges.

Later, Foley served as the Superintendent of the Eastern Smelting Wharf Office. He retired from this career in 1919.

Around July 1936, Foley was submitted to the hospital, where his health continued to decline despite receiving treatment. He died at the age of 79 in Penang. He was given a military funeral attended by most of the leadership of the SSPF.
