= Commissioner of the North Borneo Police Force =

Military commander and police chief of North Borneo (1881–1963)

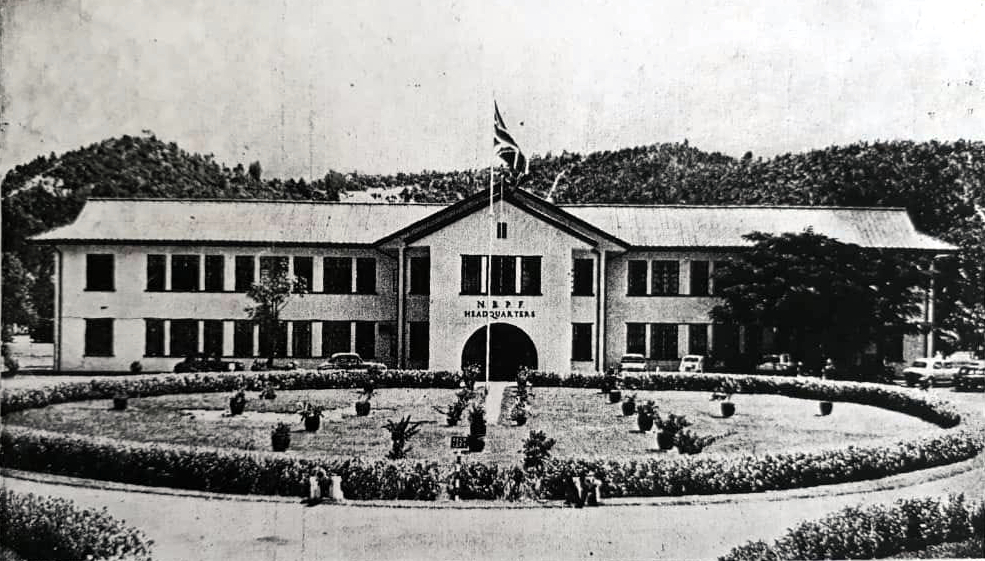
The North Borneo Police Force Headquarters at the Marina Barracks in Kepayan were opened on 10 October 1952, and the last British flag was lowered here on 31 August 1963.

The Commissioner of the North Borneo Police Force was the Police Commissioner of the North Borneo Police Force, serving a dual function as commanding officer of the only military and police force in the country. Before 1950, this position was served by the Commandant of the North Borneo Armed Constabulary, and before 1926, it was known as the Commandant of the British North Borneo Constabulary.

When North Borneo was its own country, managed entirely by the North Borneo Chartered Company, the Commandants of the Constabulary were appointed by and served at the pleasure of the Governor of North Borneo, who served as the Commander-in-chief of the country, and the Company's court of directors in London.

After the Second World War, North Borneo became the Crown Colony of North Borneo. The Constabulary was re-established in 1946, and then re-badged in 1950 as the North Borneo Police Force. The Commissioners of the North Borneo Police Force here served at the pleasure of the Governor and The Crown, laterally reporting to the chiefs of the Colonial Office and the Colonial Police Service.

== Commandants of the British North Borneo Constabulary ==
Commandant of the British North Borneo Constabulary

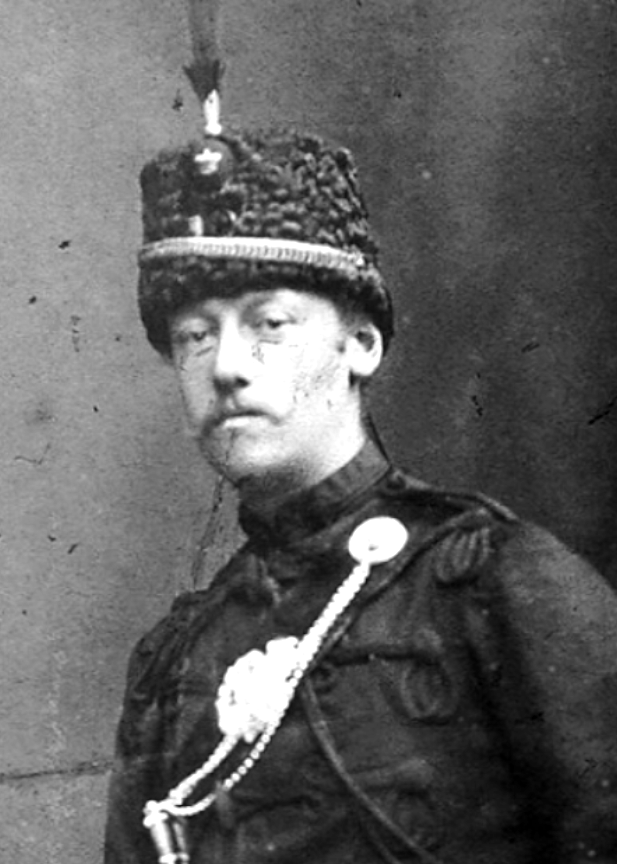
- First Commandant, Arthur Montgomery Harington
- British North Borneo Constabulary
- Reports to: Governor of North Borneo
- Seat: Fort Hill, Kudat (1881–1883); THE Barracks, Sandakan (1883–1902); Victoria Barracks, Jesselton (1902–1942)
- Appointer: North Borneo Chartered Company
- Formation: 1881
- First holder: Arthur Montgomery Harington

British North Borneo
No.	Portrait	Begin	End	Name	Ref.
1		1881	1883	Arthur Montgomery Harington	
–		1883	1883	William James Foley	
–		1883	7 June 1883	Edward Peregrine Gueritz	
2		7 June 1883	17 May 1885 †	Alexander Mortier de Fontaine	
–		17 May 1885	June 1885	William Raffles Flint	
3		?	14 June 1886 #	John Smith	
–		March 1887	March 1887	William Raffles Flint	
4		August 1886	August 1889	Robert Dudley Beeston	
5		August 1889	November 1896	Edward Algernon Barnett	
–		November 1896	February 1897	William Raffles Flint	
6		8 February 1897	1899	John Murray Reddie	
7		April 1899	31 May 1926	Charles H. Harington	

== Commandants of the North Borneo Armed Constabulary ==
Commandant of the North Borneo Armed Constabulary
- North Borneo Armed Constabulary
- Reports to: Governor of North Borneo
- Seat: Victoria Barracks, Jesselton (1902–1942); Humphreys Street Police Station, Sandakan (1945-1952)
- Appointer: North Borneo Chartered Company
- Formation: 1926
- First holder: Henry Stanley Bond
- Abolished: 1950

No.	Portrait	Begin	End	Name	Ref.
8		1 June 1926	15 April 1931	Henry Stanley Bond	
9		16 April 1931	16 May 1942 (POW)	Wilfrid Carne Cole-Adams	

=== World War II ===
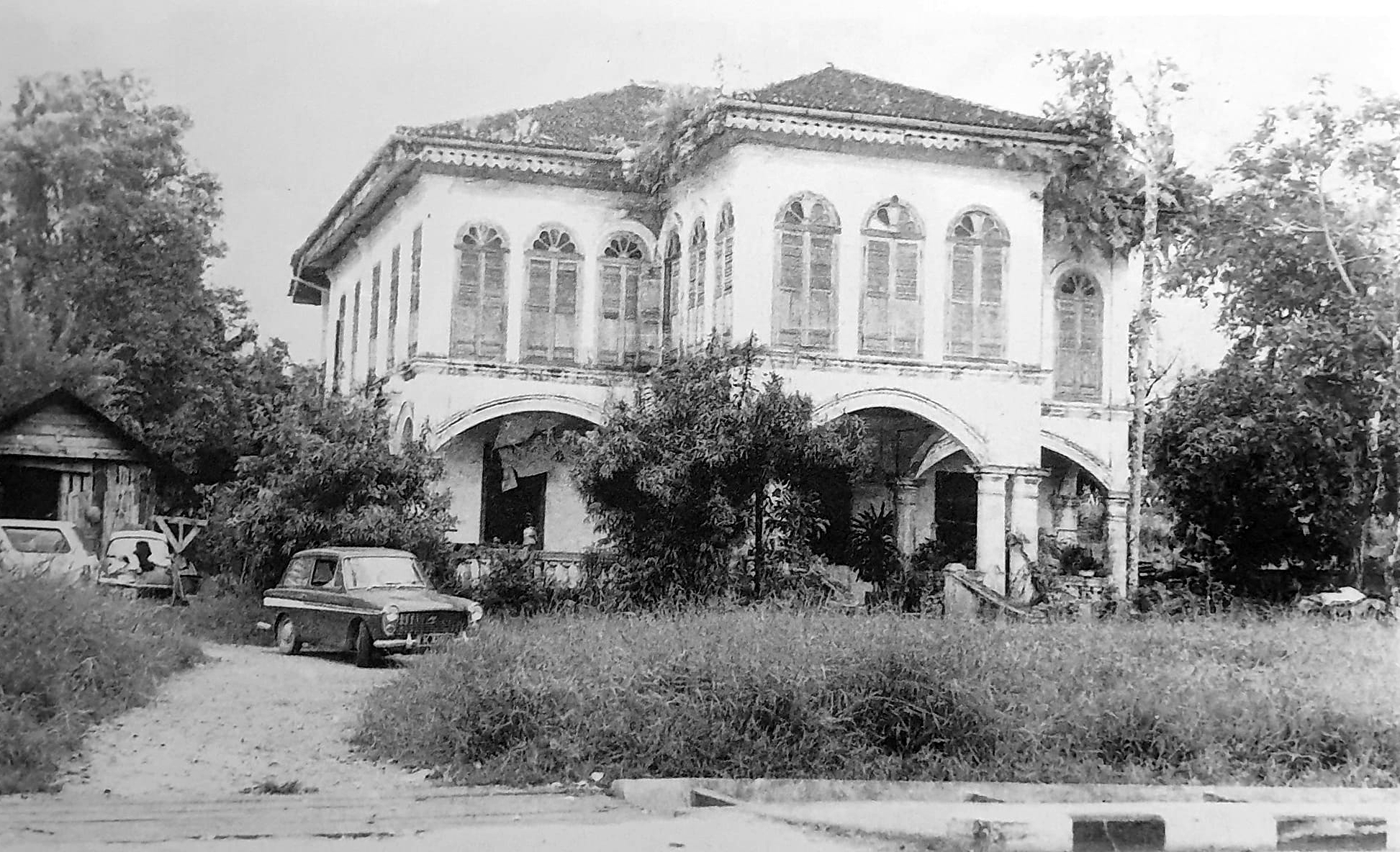
Kempeitai headquarters at Jawa Road No.1, Kuching. This building was torn down after the war.

**Wilfrid Carne Adams was the brother of Bernard Randall Cole-Adams, who was killed in the camps.**

During the Second World War, the Constabulary was split in function. While technically under the command of the Imperial Japanese Kempeitai, the Japanese secret police force – the continuity of government was maintained because all of the government administrators of the colony were interred in the same prisoner of war camps in Borneo in the initial phases of the war. Governor Charles Robert Smith was able to secretly maintain complete command and control over the Constabulary until the plot was discovered, and Lionel Matthews was executed by the Japanese.

Japanese North Borneo From 1 April 1942 to 10 June 1945.
No.	Portrat	Begin	End	Name	Ref.
–		1 April 1942	10 June 1945	Tatsuji Suga	
–		1 April 1942	10 June 1945	Kempeitai	
British Armed Forces
No.	Portrait	Begin	End	Name	Ref.
?		September 1942	January 1943	Alan Rice-Oxley	
?		January 1943	2 March 1944 (executed)	Lionel Matthews	

=== Postwar Reconstruction Era ===
After the war, the British Military Administration (Borneo) organized the re-structuring of the former countries and colonies of British Borneo. They established police headquarters at the Humphrey Street Police Station in Jesselton.

British Military Administration of Borneo (1945–1946)
No.	Portrait	Begin	End	Name	Ref.
?		?	?	?	

=== Postwar North Borneo ===
Crown Colony of North Borneo (1946–1950)
No.	Portrait	Begin	End	Name	Ref.
?		?	?	Alan Rice-Oxley	
?		1947	1950	John Bartholomew Atkinson	

== Commissioners of the North Borneo Police Force ==
Commissioner of the North Borneo Police Force
- North Borneo Police Force
- Member of: Colonial Police Service
- Reports to: Governor of North Borneo
- Seat: Humphreys Street Police Station, Sandakan (1945-1952); Marina Barracks, Kepayan (1952–1963)
- Appointer: Colonial Office
- Formation: 1950
- First holder: ?
- Abolished: 1963

Crown Colony of North Borneo
No.	Image	Begin	End	Name	Ref.
1		1950	1960	John Bartholomew Atkinson	
2		1960	1963	Donald Matheson	
Sabah State Royal Malaysia Police Force; 1963 – 1965
1		1963	1964	Donald Matheson	
–		?	March 20, 1964	E. O. "Chip" Plunkett	
2		?	1965	Roy Henry	
