= Donald Matheson =

Donald Matheson or Don Matheson may refer to:

- Donald Matheson (politician) in 1870 Manitoba general election
- Donald Matheson (missionary) in list of Protestant missionaries in China
- Donald Matheson of Shin, of Clan Matheson
- Donald Macleod Matheson (1896–1979), Secretary to the National Trust
- Donald Matheson, British Army officer, see 1887 Golden Jubilee Honours
- Donald Matheson (police officer), British colonial police officer
- Don Matheson (1929–2014), actor

== See also ==
- Donald Mathieson
