= Charles Herbert Harington =

Commandant of British North Borneo Constabulary (1874–1941)

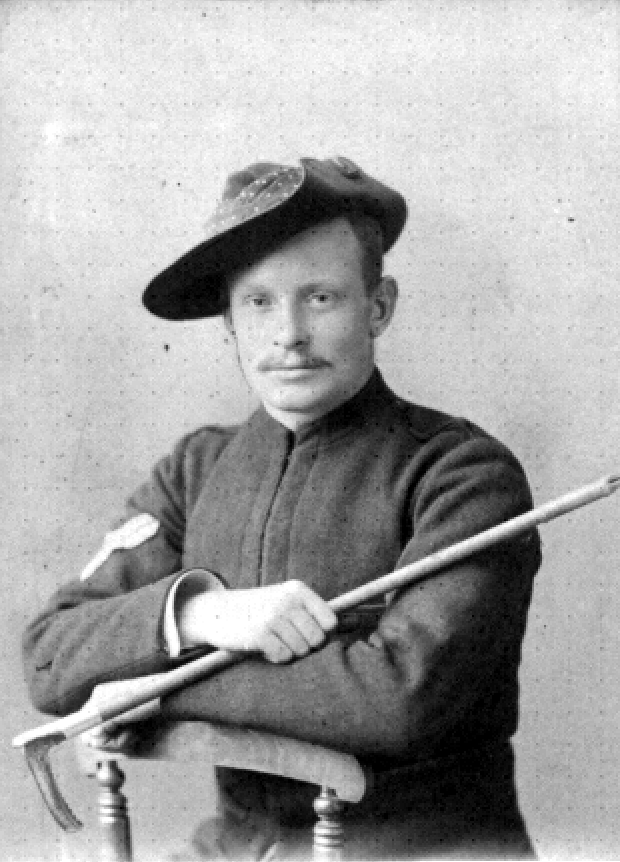

7th Commandant of the British North Borneo Constabulary
- In office April 1899 – 31 May 1926
- Appointed by: Leicester Paul Beaufort
- Preceded by: John Murray Reddie
- Succeeded by: Henry Stanley Bond

Personal details
- Born: 28 July 1874 Dalhousie, India
- Died: 29 June 1941 (aged 66) Fering, Sussex, England
- Spouse: Ethel Marion Delve-Cocks
- Relations: Arthur Montgomery Harington (Uncle)
- Parents: Cecilia Charlotte Cary; Frederick Donelly Harington
- Awards: Tambunan Expedition Medal

Military service
- Rank: Major
- Unit: Rifle Brigade (The Prince Consort's Own); Cape Mounted Rifles; British South Africa Police; British North Borneo Constabulary
- Battles/wars: Boer Wars; Jameson Raid; Mat Salleh Rebellion; Tambunan Expedition; Kudat Raid

Charles Herbert Harington (1874-1941) was an important figure in the history of North Borneo (present day Sabah). He was the longest-serving Commandant of the British North Borneo Constabulary in its history, and also occupied other duties within the colony's government. He led many punitive expeditions into the interior of the colony, but is most-known as leading the expedition that killed Mat Salleh.

== Biography ==
=== Early life ===
Harington was born in the British Raj in 1874, nephew of Arthur Montgomery Harington, who held a long career in the British Army, and was the 1st-serving Commandant of the British North Borneo Constabulary.

Harington was sent to a public boarding school in England, and eventually found his way into the Cape Mounted Rifles and the British South Africa Police (BSAP). In the Cape Colony, he fought in the Jameson Raid.

=== North Borneo ===
In 1896, some time after the Jameson Raid, Harington joined the service of the North Borneo Chartered Company. The company, as it was often called, was the sole governing authority over British North Borneo, what was known as a British protectorate, but not a colony. After an interview at the company's London Headquarters on Leadenhall Street, where all new recruits to the Constabulary were interviewed, he was sent to North Borneo.

Almost as soon as arriving in Borneo, Harington became disgruntled by the leadership style of William Raffles Flint, the Acting Commandant and a longtime member of the Constabulary. Flint had been Acting Commandant several times, and had even taken a contingent to the Diamond Jubilee of Queen Victoria, but Harington complained that Flint had created a poor working environment that was unprofessional and "slovenly."

In 1899, at the age of 25, Harington was appointed Commandant of the Constabulary, taking over command from John Murray Reddie. He led many punitive expeditions into the interior of the colony, but is most–known as leading the expedition that killed Mat Salleh.

=== England ===
In 1913, shortly before the outbreak of the First World War, Harington was married in Leigh, Greater Manchester to his wife, Ethel. They lived in Borneo for a little over a decade, but in 1926, with his wife and children, Harington stepped onto a steamship for England.

== Dates of rank ==
- Major, 1907
