= Donald Matheson (police officer) =

British colonial police officer

Donald Matheson CBE
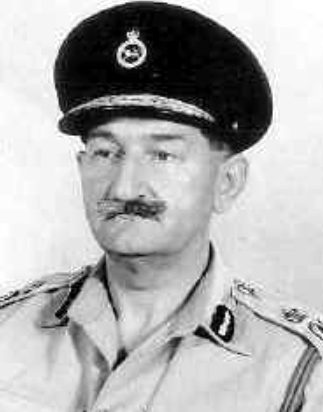

Postmaster of the Forest Hill Post Office
- In office September 1964 – ?
- Appointed by: General Post Office

Commissioner of the Sabah Component, Royal Malaysia Police
- In office 1963–1964
- Preceded by: Self, as Commissioner of NBPF
- Succeeded by: E. O. "Chip" Plunkett (Acting)

Commissioner of the North Borneo Police Force
- In office 1960–1963
- Appointed by: Governor of North Borneo
- Preceded by: John Bartholomew Atkinson
- Succeeded by: Self, as Commissioner of RMPF Sabah

Commissioner of the British Guiana Police Force
- In office 1953–1960

Personal details
- Born: 1913 or 1914 Tomintoul, Banffshire, Scotland, United Kingdom
- Died: ?
- Relations: W. R. Kelman (Brother-in-law); 1x sister; John (Brother)
- Parent: John Matheson
- Awards

Military service
- Battles/wars: Brunei revolt; Indonesia–Malaysia confrontation
- Police career
- Country: (United Kingdom) Colonial Police Service
- Department: (England) London Metropolitan Police; (Colonial Nigeria) Nigeria Police Force; British Guiana Police Force; (Crown Colony of North Borneo) North Borneo Police Force

Donald Matheson was a Scottish police officer who served as the Commissioner of the North Borneo Police Force during the height of the Cold War in Southeast Asia, leading the department into the tumultuous era of Sabah's exit from the British Empire, with his police responding to pirate raids, land wars with Indonesia and Brunei, and an annexation claim by the Philippines. After returning to England, he became the postmaster of Forest Hill, Oxfordshire.

== Biography ==
=== Early life ===
Donald Matheson was born around the year 1914 in Tomintoul, Banffshire, Scotland, a little village that claimed to be "the highest village in the Scottish Highlands." He was the youngest son of John Matheson, originally of Benavon. He was educated at the Tonimtoul School, before moving to the Abbey school at Fort Augustus Abbey in the town of Fort Augustus, along the southern coast of Loch Ness.

At the height of the Great Depression in the United Kingdom, Matheson couldn't get a job anywhere in Scotland, and not wanting to go on the dole, he moved south to London.

In 1930, Matheson joined the London Metropolitan Police.

=== Nigeria ===
Sometime between 1932 and 1933, Atkinson moved to Colonial Nigeria, joining the Nigeria Police Force. In March 1944, after having served a decade in Nigeria, in the town of Jos, he was promoted to the rank of Assistant Superintendent. Later, he moved to Lagos where he became Assistant Commissioner and Deputy Commissioner of police.

In 1953, Matheson was awarded the King's Police and Fire Services Medal for meritorious service, recognised at the 1953 Coronation Honours.

He served in Nigeria for 12 years.

=== British Guiana ===
In the summer of 1956, he moved to British Guiana to become Police Commissioner there, taking charge of the British Guiana Police Force. In Guiana, he was forced to deal with riots and revolutions against Colonial rule, and experienced his first real sophisticated criminal networks.

In 1958, he was awarded the Queen’s Police Medal for his service in British Guiana, and was recognised in the 1959 New Year Honours.

=== North Borneo ===
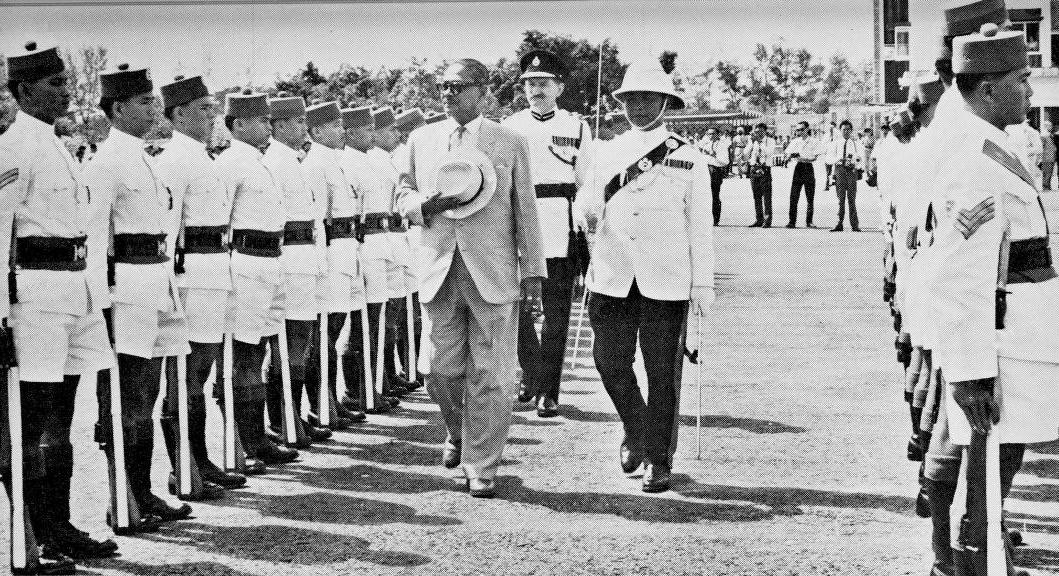
During the process of self determination for both North Borneo and Sarawak, and the merger into Malaysia, in November 1962, Tunku Abdul Rahman arrived in Jesselton. Upon his arrival, he performed an inspection of the Guard of Honour at Jesselton Airport. Matheson, seen here in the center of the frame behind the Tun, very soon after sent the Mobile Police Force to respond to the Brunei revolt.

In 1960, as the Commissioner of the North Borneo Police Force (NBPF), he lamented that he could not attract enough qualified candidates for the force with higher education levels.

In March 1962, Atkinson noted that North Borneo usually averaged about half a dozen acts of piracy a month, and the NBPF Marine Branch ran 24-hour anti-piracy patrols along the coast.

In November 1962, Atkinson awarded three men with awards for bravery.

=== Sabah ===
In 1963, the Crown Colony of North Borneo gained independence as Sabah, and the North Borneo Police Force was remade into the Sabah Component of the Royal Malaysia Police Force (RMPF Sabah).

In May 1963, Atkinson awarded a citation and $300 cash to Tseu En Fook, a civilian who came to the aid of a policeman.

In September 1963, when speaking about the problem of piracy in Borneo, he told a reporter from The Straits Times: "Touch wood, there will be no more raids. We haven't had one since February this year."

In October 1964, Matheson announced that he had ordered a mandatory vaccine requirement for all Sabah State police.

In January 1965, Matheson announced that fireworks and gaming were prohibited during Chinese New Year, as the country of Malaysia had made them illegal.

=== Return to England ===
In September 1965, Matheson joined the service of the General Post Office, and took charge as the Postmaster of the Forest Hill Post Office in Forest Hill, Oxfordshire where he also became a grocer in charge of the town's store. In 1966, he was made a Commander of the British Empire in the 1966 New Year Honours. In an interview with the local newspaper on the recepit of the award, he said: "I've no cause to go publicising my past history. I came here with my family to settle down and make a quiet living – to become part of the village. And that's what I intend to do."
