= Donald Mathieson =

Donald Mathieson or Don Mathieson, may refer to:

- Donald Mathieson (cricketer) (1931–2026), Australian cricketer
- Donald Mathieson (businessman), chairman of the Caledonian Railway
- Don Mathieson (lawyer), New Zealand Queens' Council

== See also ==
- Donald Matheson
