= James Calder =

James or Jim Calder may refer to:

== Politicians ==
- James Alexander Calder (1868–1956), Canadian politician
- James Erskine Calder (1808–1882), English-born Surveyor General of Tasmania

== Sportsmen ==
- Jim Calder (footballer) (born 1960), Scottish footballer
- Jim Calder (rugby union) (born 1957), Scottish international
- Jim Calder (rugby league) (fl. 1930s), New Zealand international

== Others ==
- James Calder (academic administrator) (1826–1893), fifth president of Pennsylvania State University, USA
- James Traill Calder (1794–1864), Scottish local historian
- Sir James Calder, 1st Baronet (1686–1711), of the Calder baronets
- Sir James Calder, 3rd Baronet (1760–1774), of the Calder baronets
- James Calder (orthopaedic surgeon) (born 1968), English orthopaedic surgeon

== See also ==
- Calder (surname)
