= Arthur Montgomery Harington =

British army and police officer (1847–1909)

Bey Arthur Montgomery Harington
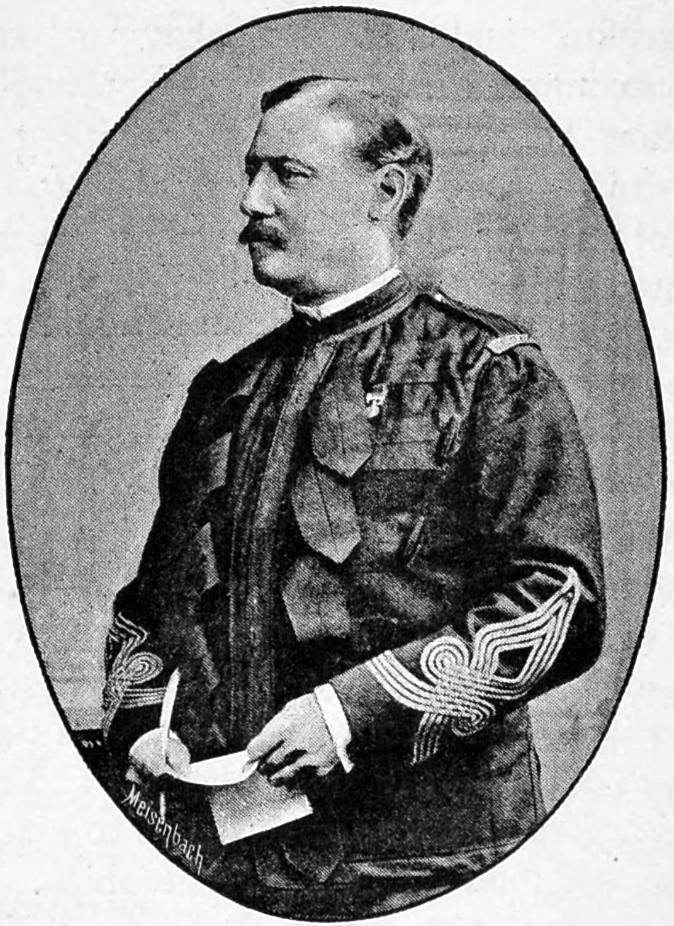

Commandant of the Cairo City Police
- In office 1891–1902

Commandant of the Suez Canal Police
- In office 1890

Inspector in Charge of the Assiout Division
- In office 1884

Chief of Staff of the Egyptian Gendarmerie
- In office 1883

1st Commandant of the British North Borneo Constabulary
- In office 1881–1883
- Appointed by: British North Borneo Company
- Governor: William Hood Treacher
- Preceded by: Position established
- Succeeded by: A. M. de Fontaine

Personal details
- Born: 16 July 1847 Goruckpore, India, Company Raj
- Died: 8 December 1909 (aged 62) Royal Avenue, Chelsea, England
- Spouse: Mary Macdonald
- Relations: Charles Herbert Harington (Nephew)
- Children: Arthur Stuart Harington
- Parent: Henry Byng Harington

Military service
- Branch/service: Rifle Brigade; Egyptian Gendarmerie; British North Borneo Constabulary
- Rank: Colonel
- Battles/wars: Ashanti War; Battle of Amoaful; Battle of Ordahsu; Capture of Coomassie; First Suakin Expedition

Arthur Montgomery Harington (1847 – 1909) was a career officer of the British Army who was seconded to appointments in military and police departments throughout the British Empire. He is most notable as the founding Commandant of the British North Borneo Constabulary, but also served in the Egyptian Gendarmerie and Egyptian National Police for 20 years, holding the rank of Commandant of both the Cairo City Police and the Suez Canal Police.

== Biography ==
Born under the rule of the Company Raj in 1847, Harington entered into the British Army as an Ensign in 1867, at the age of 19.

In 1871, he became a Lieutenant in the Rifle Brigade (The Prince Consort's Own), where the 2nd Battalion took him to the Gold Coast several years later to fight in the Anglo-Ashanti wars, including in the Battle of Amoaful, the Battle of Ordahsu, and the Capture of Coomassie.

In 1879, he was sent to British Egypt where he was made a Colonel of the Egyptian Gendarmerie.

=== North Borneo ===
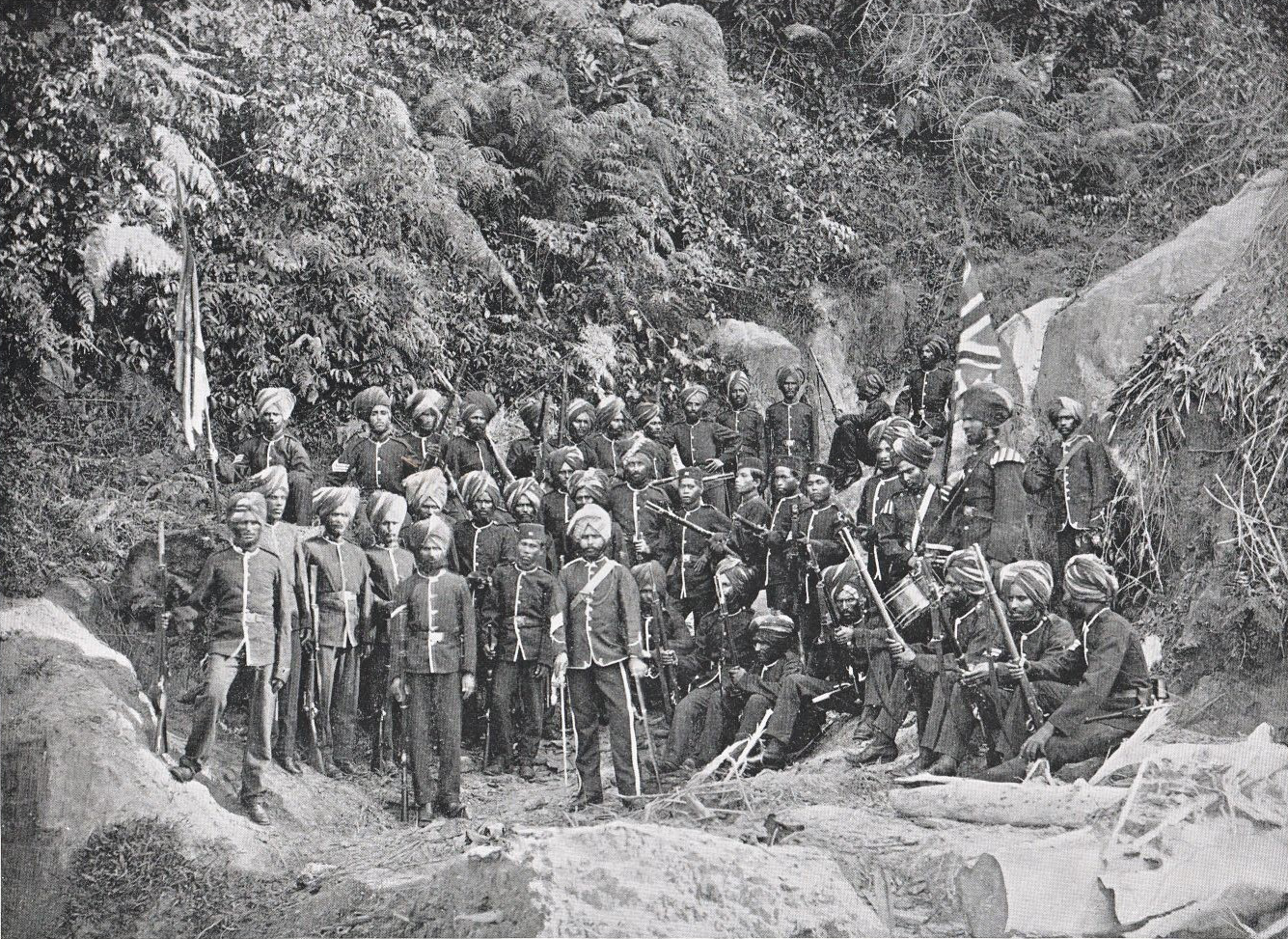
Harington served as the first Commandant of the British North Borneo Constabulary.

In 1881, Harington was in London, where he was recruited him into the service of the British North Borneo Company. The Company had recently just managed to secure their status as the sole governing authority over North Borneo (present day Sabah), and were looking for men educated in Britain to help them run their new country. They had found a Governor of North Borneo in William Hood Treacher, and were in the process of establishing the country's Residencies.

Before the country could be officially established, however, it needed a police force. Certain members of the British Parliament, especially Henry Richard, were also hesitant to allow the country to station permanent British military forces there, afraid that they would be unnecessarily drawn into conflicts with people Britain had no quarrel with. Therefore, the new outfit had to serve a dual function, both as the new country's police force, and as its military.

Treacher appointed Harington as the inaugural Commandant of the newly established British North Borneo Constabulary. The rest of the year of 1881 was spent growing the Constabulary, and in January 1882, Harington was sent on a mission to Bengal to recruit a force of Sikhs who preferably had already received police training in India, and were looking for an adventure away from home.

Harington, still intending to travel to India, had already stopped in Penang, British Singapore, Perak, but he then received orders from Court of Directors to return to North Borneo. By this point, he had recruited roughly 100 men from those counties, and they were Sikhs, Sepoys, and Somalis.

They were intended to be an imposing force upon the indigenous population of the island, who had never experienced being policed by an immigrant force. The imposing group of men were described by one of their superiors in an official report as:

"undisciplined rabble, practically the refuse of the Sikhs scattered through the Straits Settlements, who only came to Borneo because they would not obtain employment elsewhere."

The plan for the Constabulary was to divide it into two primary forces; the Indian Force would serve the major towns and cities and under the control of the Commandant, while the Native Force would be placed under the command of the Residents. Governor Treacher and Harington both desired an initial force of 200 men which would grow as the country developed, but the Court of Directors almost immediately slashed that number by 50 men. When this happened, Harington got into a heated disagreement with Governor Treacher, and resigned from the Constabulary out of frustration.

He did not, however, leave the Company. His nephew, Charles Herbert Harington three years after Harington left the island, also moved to North Borneo to join the Constabulary, where he would become the longest-serving Commandant in its history. In later years, Harington also joined the boards of several Company subsidiaries in London.

=== Later career ===
Harington once again returned to Egypt and into the service of the Egyptian Germanderie. His management in Borneo gave him the requisite experience needed to be appointed Chief of Staff of the Gendarmerie.

However, Sir Gerald Graham with the Egyptian Army were recruiting soldiers to go down to Sudan, and in 1884, Harington joined them on the first Suakin Expedition.

At the end of this expedition, and for the next two decades, Harington served in various leadership roles throughout Egypt.

In 1898 at Alexandria, he worked closely with German Consul von Hartmann to contain a rising anarchist movement there, and a plot to murder the German Emperor in Cairo. Concluding the investigation, he arrested nine Italians who were planning on detonating bombs to kill the Emperor when he came to the city.

In 1909, he died at age 62 in Royal Avenue, Chelsea, London.

== Awards ==
Ribbon	Date	Award	Clasp(s)	Ref
	1874	Ashantee Medal	Coomassie	
	1884	Khedive's Star		
	1884	Egypt Medal	Suakin	
	1887	Colonial Medal	Port Said	
		Order of the Medjidie, 3rd class		
		Order of Osmanieh, 3rd class		

== Dates of rank ==
Patch	Rank	Date	Ref
	Ensign	20 February 1867	
	Lieutenant	28 October 1871	
	Captain	15 February 1879	
	Colonel		
