= Punitive Expeditions Medal =

Campaign medal of the British North Borneo Company

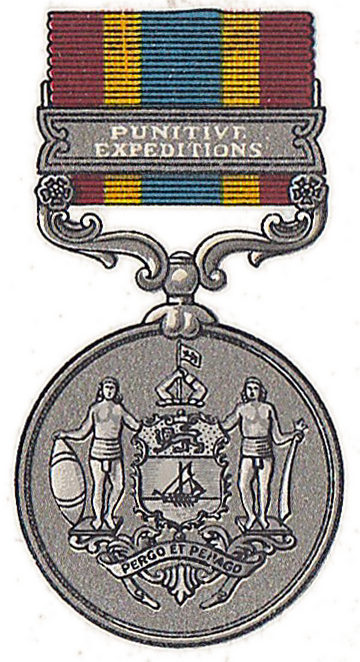
- Type: Campaign medal
- Awarded for: Service in the Punitive Expeditions in North Borneo
- Description: Hanging medal with service ribbon and clasp
- Date: 1898
- Country: North Borneo
- Presented by: British North Borneo Company; British Empire
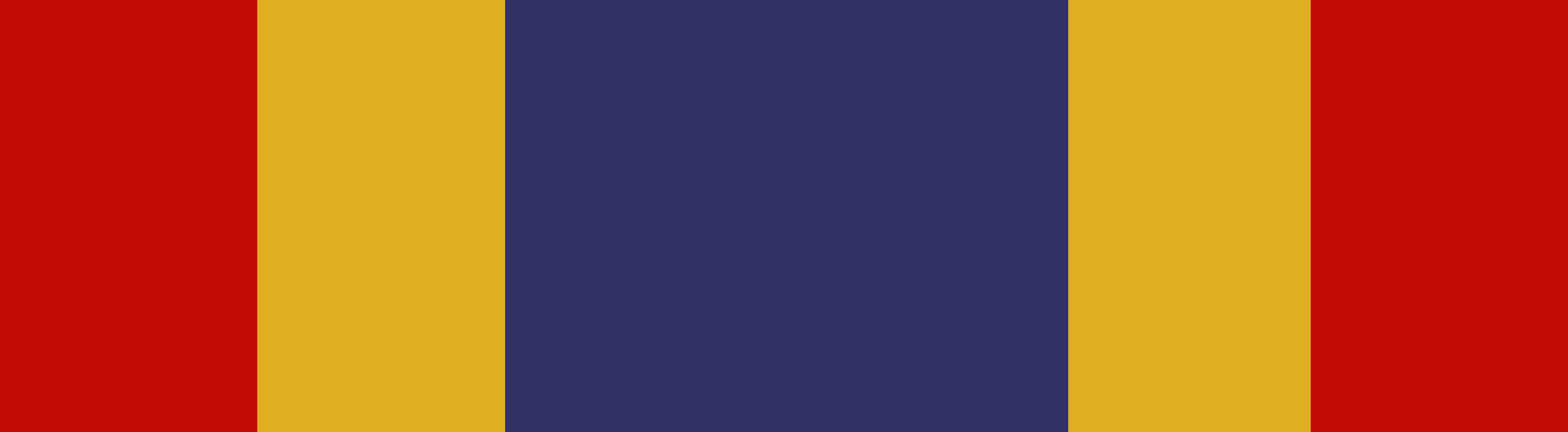
- Ribbon

Highlights
- Silver: Officers
- Bronze: NCO's and enlisted

The Punitive Expeditions Medal of the North Borneo Company was awarded to those veterans of the British North Borneo Company (BNBC), and especially the British North Borneo Constabulary who served in the Punitive Expeditions in North Borneo between 1888 and 1916, and especially the Mat Salleh Rebellion. It was produced in silver and bronze variants.

This was the second medal issued for combat during the war. The first was the Punitive Expedition Medal, nearly identical to this one, but named with a singular noun and issued with an orange ribbon, issued for the Punitive Expedition of 1897. Another medal issued during the war was the Tambunan Expedition Medal, issued for the Tambunan Expedition of 1900 which succeeded in killing Mat Salleh.

Other medals awarded by the British North Borneo Company include:

- Gallantry Cross (North Borneo), 1890, in silver and bronze
- Rundum Expedition Medal, 1915
- General Service Medal (North Borneo), 1937
