= Punitive Expedition Medal =

Campaign medal for British North Borneo (1897)

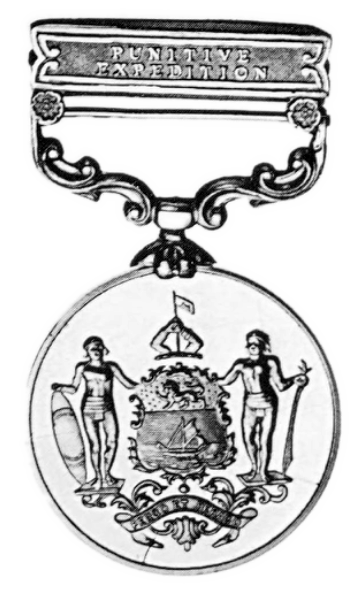
- Type: Campaign medal
- Awarded for: Service in the 1897 Punitive Expedition in North Borneo
- Description: Hanging medal with service ribbon and clasp
- Date: 1897
- Country: North Borneo
- Presented by: British North Borneo Company; British Empire
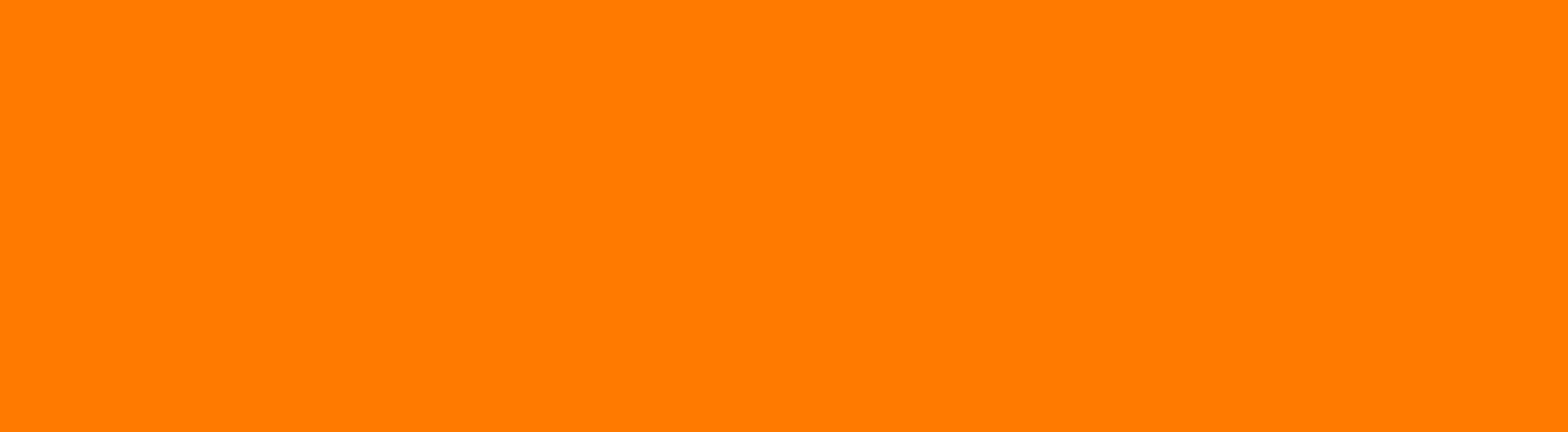
- Ribbon

Highlights
- Silver: Officers
- Bronze: NCO's and enlisted

The Punitive Expedition Medal of 1897 was awarded to those veterans of the British North Borneo Company (BNBC), and especially the British North Borneo Constabulary who served in the first punitive expedition to crush Mat Salleh in North Borneo in the year 1897 in the initial stages of the Mat Salleh Rebellion. It was produced in silver and bronze variants.

This was the first medal issued by the company for the war, notably with an orange ribbon and a singular noun. The next medal issued was the Punitive Expeditions Medal (plural noun and tricolor ribbon), issued for fighting taking place in the year 1888 and afterward. Other medals were issued for this war as well, including the Tambunan Expedition Medal, and the Rundum Expedition Medal.
