= Tambunan Expedition Medal =

Campaign medal of British North Borneo

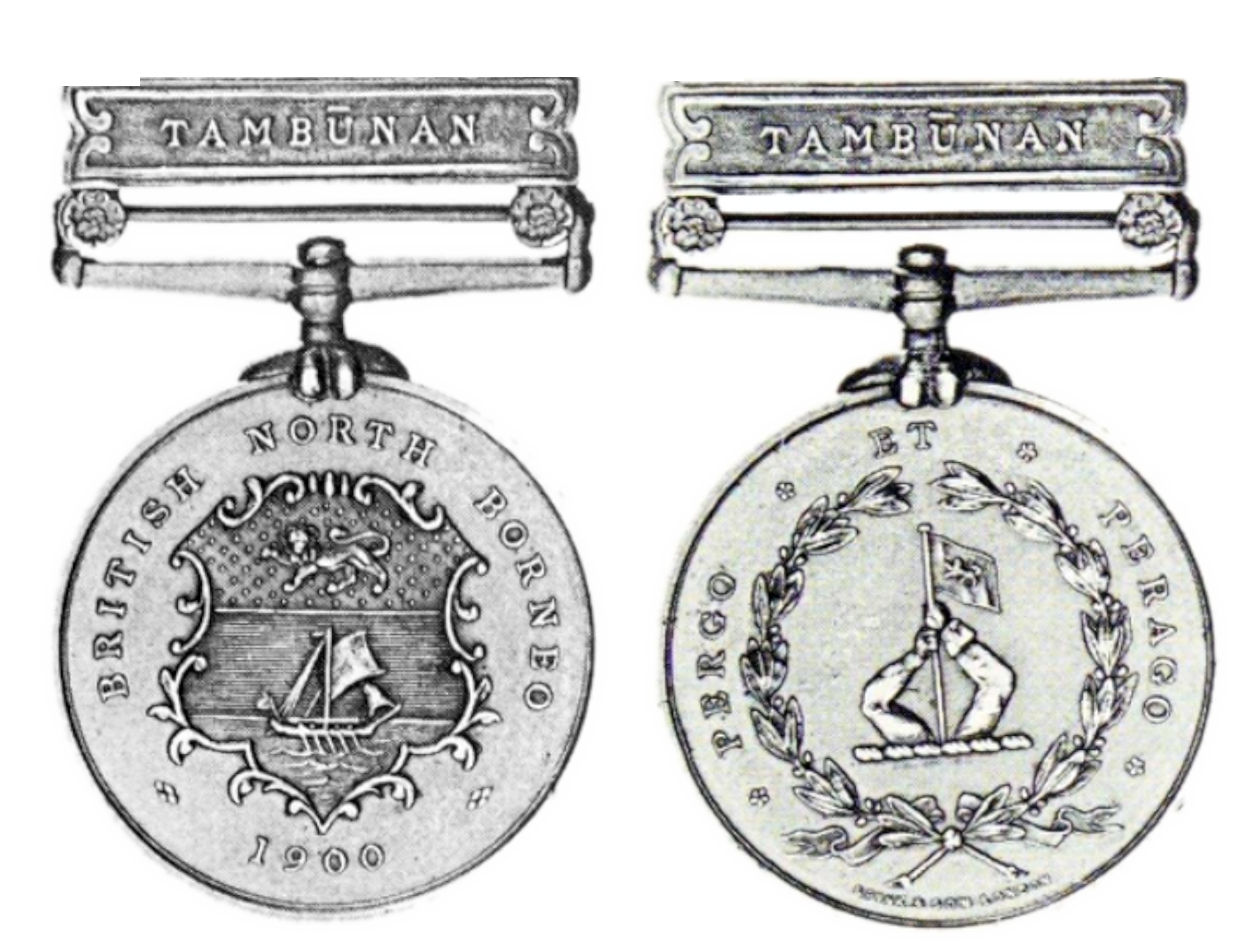
- Type: Campaign medal
- Awarded for: Service in the Tambunan Expedition to crush the Mat Salleh Rebellion
- Description: Hanging medal with service ribbon and clasp
- Date: 1900
- Country: North Borneo
- Presented by: British North Borneo Company; British Empire
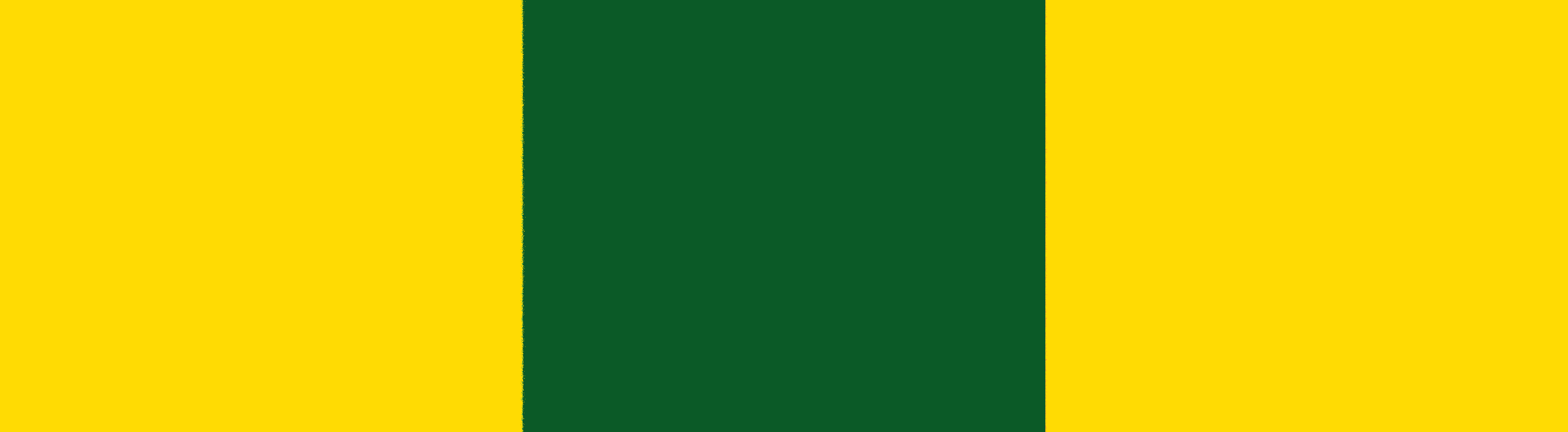
- Ribbon

Highlights
- Silver: Officers
- Bronze: NCO's and enlisted

The Tambunan Expedition Medal was awarded to those veterans of the British North Borneo Company (BNBC), and especially the British North Borneo Constabulary who served in North Borneo as part of the punitive expedition into the Tambunan Valley, Tambunan District, to take action against Mat Salleh and crush the Mat Salleh Rebellion. Mat Salleh was killed in this expedition, in a fort at the town that is still called Tambunan.

This was the third medal issued for the war. The first was the Punitive Expedition Medal, for actions during the 1897 expedition, and the second was the Punitive Expeditions Medal, for actions from 1898 and afterward. Another medal was issued for this war called the Rundum Expedition Medal.
