= Colonial Police Service =

Coordinator of all British Empire colonies policing (established 1936)

Agency overview
- Formed: 1936
- Dissolved: Gradually from 1954 to 1997

Jurisdictional structure
- Operations jurisdiction: British Empire and United Kingdom

Operational structure
- Elected officer responsible: Secretary of State for the Colonies
- Agency executive: Colonial Police Advisor, William Johnson (1 November 1948)
- Parent agency: Colonial Service; Her Majesty's Overseas Civil Service

The Colonial Police Service (CPS) was a British organisation formed in 1936 with the intention of standardising police forces in the United Kingdom's Crown Colonies, Protectorates and Mandatory Palestine. It did not become operationalized, however, until after the end of the Second World War. Itself part of the overall Colonial Service, it acted as an umbrella organisation for existing bodies such as the Palestine Police Force, Royal Gibraltar Police, the Cyprus Military Police, the Federated Malay States Police Force, and the North Borneo Police Force.

Its formation came after Sir Warren Fisher and the Fisher Committee created recommendations to reform policing in the British Empire. By 1948, there were 43 total police forces and agencies that fell under its jurisdiction; every police force of the British colonies, protectorates, and territories.

In 1951, CPS hosted the first-ever Colonial Police Commissioners' Conference in history. Police chiefs and commissioners from around the world came to London to discuss the postwar environment of policing in the Empire, and especially to discuss the Malayan Emergency and Operation Service.

== List of police forces in the Colonial Police Service ==
- West Africa
  - Nigeria Police Force
  - Gold Coast Police
  - Sierra Leone Police
  - Gambia Police Force
- East Africa
  - Kenya Police
  - Uganda Police Force
  - Tanganyika Police Force
  - Zanzibar Police
- Central & Southern Africa
  - Northern Rhodesia Police
  - Nyasaland Police Force
  - Basutoland Mounted Police
  - Bechuanaland Protectorate Police
  - Swaziland Police
- North/Northeast Africa
  - Eritrea Field Force
  - Somaliland Police
- Asia & Middle East
  - Palestine Police Force
  - Cyprus Military Police
  - Aden Police
  - Indian Imperial Police
  - Indian Police Service
- Southeast Asia
  - Federated Malay States Police Force
  - Straits Settlements Police Force
    - Singapore Police Force
  - North Borneo Police Force
  - Sarawak Constabulary
  - Royal Hong Kong Police Force
  - Ceylon Police Force
- Caribbean & Americas
  - Jamaica Constabulary Force
  - Trinidad and Tobago Police Force
  - Barbados Police Force
  - St. Lucia Police Force
  - Bahamas Police Force
  - Leeward Islands Police
    - Antigua
    - British Virgin Islands
    - Montserrat
    - St. Kitts & Nevis
    - Anguilla
  - British Guiana Police
  - British Honduras Police Force
  - Falkland Islands Police
  - Bermuda Police Service
- Mediterranean & Atlantic Islands
  - Royal Gibraltar Police
  - Malta Police Force
  - Mauritius Police Force
  - Seychelles Police Force
  - St. Helena Police
