= North Borneo Police Force =

Police and military force of North Borneo (1881–1963)

North Borneo Police Force NBPF
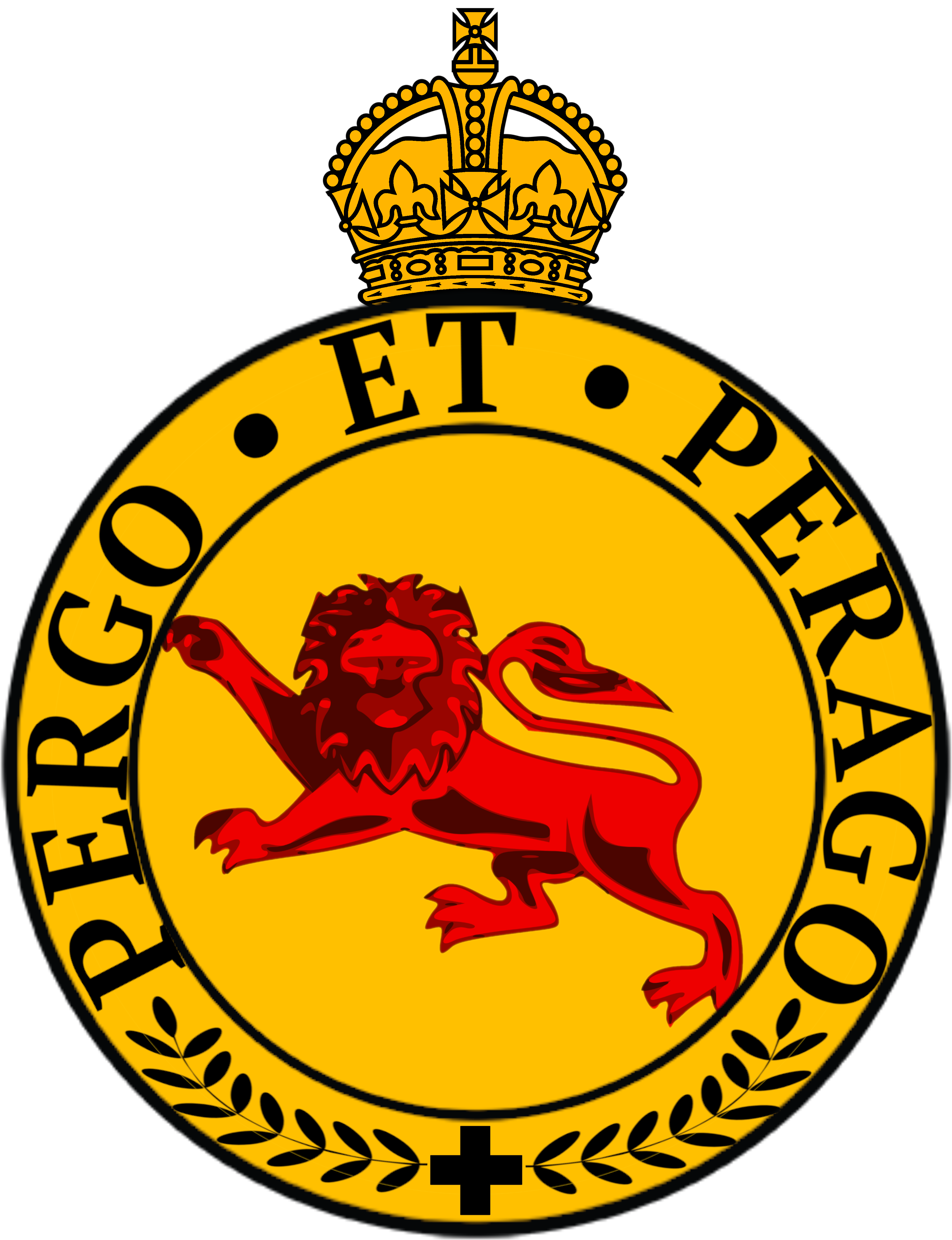
- When North Borneo became a crown colony in 1946, the British Crown was added to the top of the badge.
- Motto: PERGO ET PERAGO; GO FORTH AND PROSPER

Agency overview
- Formed: September 1881
- Dissolved: 1964
- Superseding agency: Royal Malaysia Police

Jurisdictional structure
- Operations jurisdiction: North Borneo: 1881–1942; World War II: Japanese North Borneo: 1942–1945; British Armed Forces: 1942–1946; Crown Colony: 1946–1963
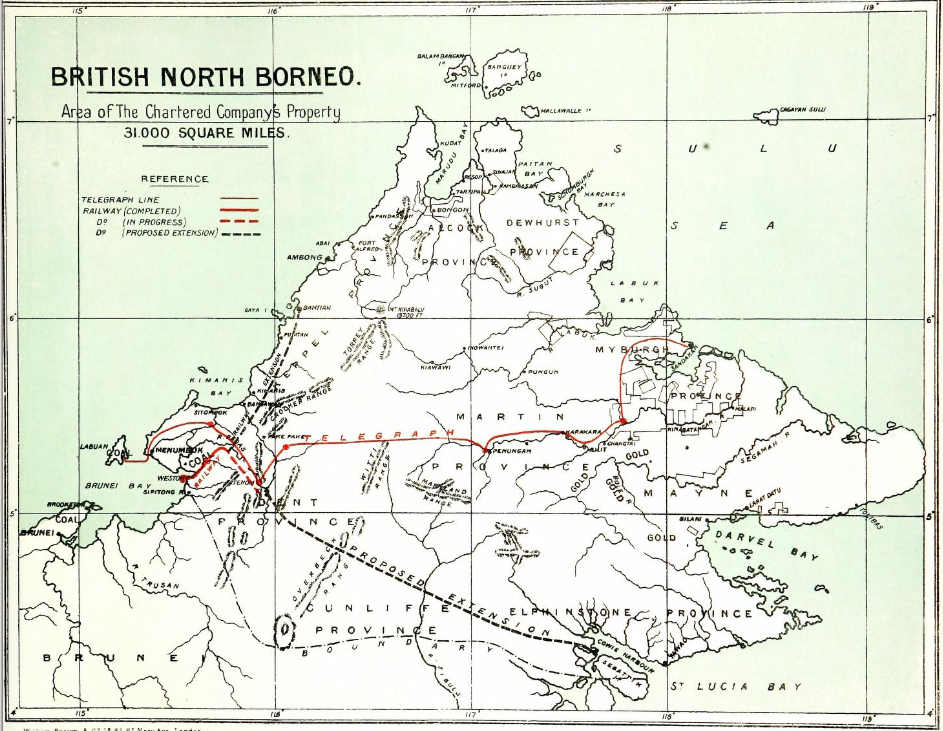
- 1899 Map of North Borneo
- Legal jurisdiction: British Borneo
- Governing body: North Borneo Company; Crown Colony

Operational structure
- Headquarters: Fort Hill, Kudat (1881–1883); THE Barracks, Sandakan (1883–1902); Victoria Barracks, Jesselton (1902–1942); Humphreys Street Police Station, Sandakan (1945–1952); Marina Barracks, Kepayan (1952–1963)
- Elected officers responsible: Governor of North Borneo; Resident; District Officer
- Agency executives: Commandant of the Constabulary; Police Commissioner

Notables
- Awards: Jubilee Medal; Punitive Expedition Medal; Punitive Expeditions Medal; Tambunan Expedition Medal; Gallantry Cross; General Service Award; Colonial Police Medal

The North Borneo Police Force (NBPF), colloquially known as the Constabulary, officially known before 1 January 1950 as the North Borneo Armed Constabulary, and before 1926 as the British North Borneo Constabulary, was the sole police force and military unit raised by the British North Borneo Company for the protection of British North Borneo. After 1946, the Constabulary would become a function of the Crown Colony of North Borneo and the Colonial Police Service. Several smaller and more elite units fell under their command, such as the North Borneo Volunteer Force and the Mobile Police.

== Overview ==
The Constabulary was created by William Hood Treacher in September 1881, shortly before the signing of the Charter of North Borneo. When the Constabulary was established, its headquarters were on a hill overlooking the town of Kudat called Fort Hill, but when the capitol was moved to Sandakan, they were at a building called The Barracks in Sandakan. Within a decade, they were at the Victoria Barracks in Jesselton. After the Second World War, they were moved to the Marina Barracks at Kepayan, which were dedicated by the Duchess of Kent. The leadership of the Constabulary primarily comprised several British officers, while the enlisted ranks were mostly indigenous troops. While originally limited to North Borneo alone, the Constabulary Ordinance Amendment No. 22 made provisions for reciprocal service between North Borneo and neighbouring territories in British Borneo.

As it was both a police and military organisation, in addition to solving crimes, the Constabulary participated in wars, battles, and expeditions. They participated in the colonial wars of the company to pacify local rebellions against colonial rule, such as the punitive expeditions launched against the Mat Salleh Rebellion. They also fought piracy in the Sulu Sea. From the inception of the Constabulary in 1881 until the invasion of the colony by the Empire of Japan in World War II, they were an extension of the Chartered Company. During the war, the Constabulary was split in its functional capacity; Officially, the Constabulary was made the police force of Japanese North Borneo. Unofficially, most of its members became guerrilla resistance fighters and spies for the British Armed Forces, resisting the Japanese administration and working to free prisoners of war (POWs), who were placed under the command of Lionel Matthews. During the Cold War, the Constabulary was deployed to combat communist insurgencies throughout the jungles of Borneo.

After the war, the company could no longer afford the management of a colony, and the Constabulary became a function of the Crown Colony of North Borneo from 1946. On 31 August 1963, the Crown Colony was disestablished when Sabah entered into self-governance, and the Constabulary fell under the independent Sabah State until the signing of the Malaysia Agreement on 16 September 1963. Shortly afterward, the Police Force was merged with the Sarawak Constabulary and the Royal Federation of Malayan Police to create the Royal Malaysia Police. Sabah possessed a British police commissioner until 1967.

== Composition ==
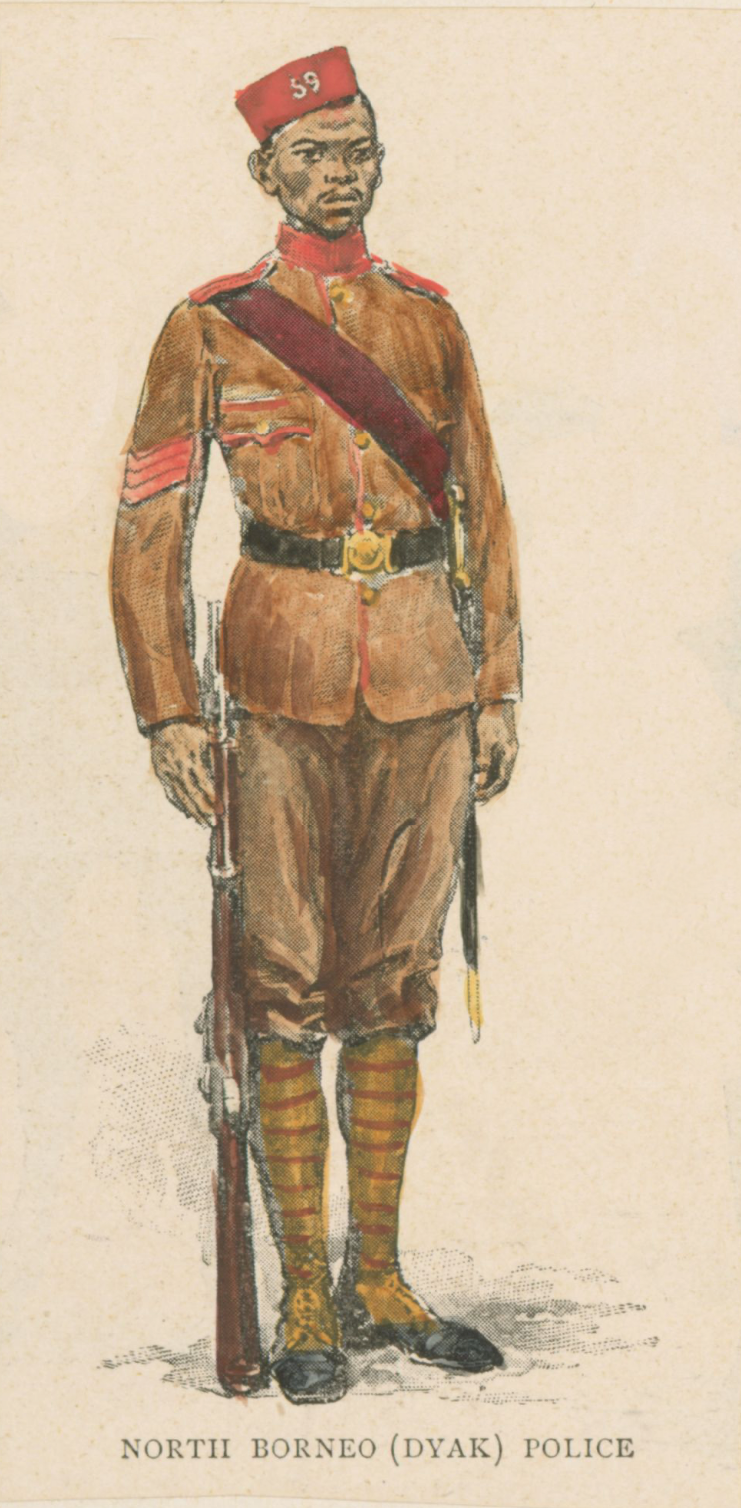
Dyaks had a large presence in the Constabulary known as the Dyak Police. Seen here is a Sergeant, indicated by the rank on his elbow and the red ceremonial sash, which was only worn by sergeants, who stood to the left of the rank in formation. This drawing is slightly inaccurate, in that Sergeants wore the Lion of Borneo on their headgear, while lower enlisted ranks wore numbers.

=== Officers ===
On the Constabulary's first day, there were only 3 gazetted officers; a Commandant of the Constabulary, Arthur Montgomery Harington, and two Sub-Commandants, who oversaw a force of non-commissioned officers and constables. The number of officers increased to 6 in 1903. The officership ranks of the Constabulary were nearly all white British officers, trained at military and police establishments in Britain. Specifically, the Company recruited the officers for both the Civil Service of North Borneo and for the Constabulary in London.

After the Constabulary was brought under the authority of the Crown Colony and the Colonial Police Service, more indigenous persons were raised through the ranks, and by the mid-1950's, at least several district Superintendents were indigenous.

=== NCOs and enlisted ===
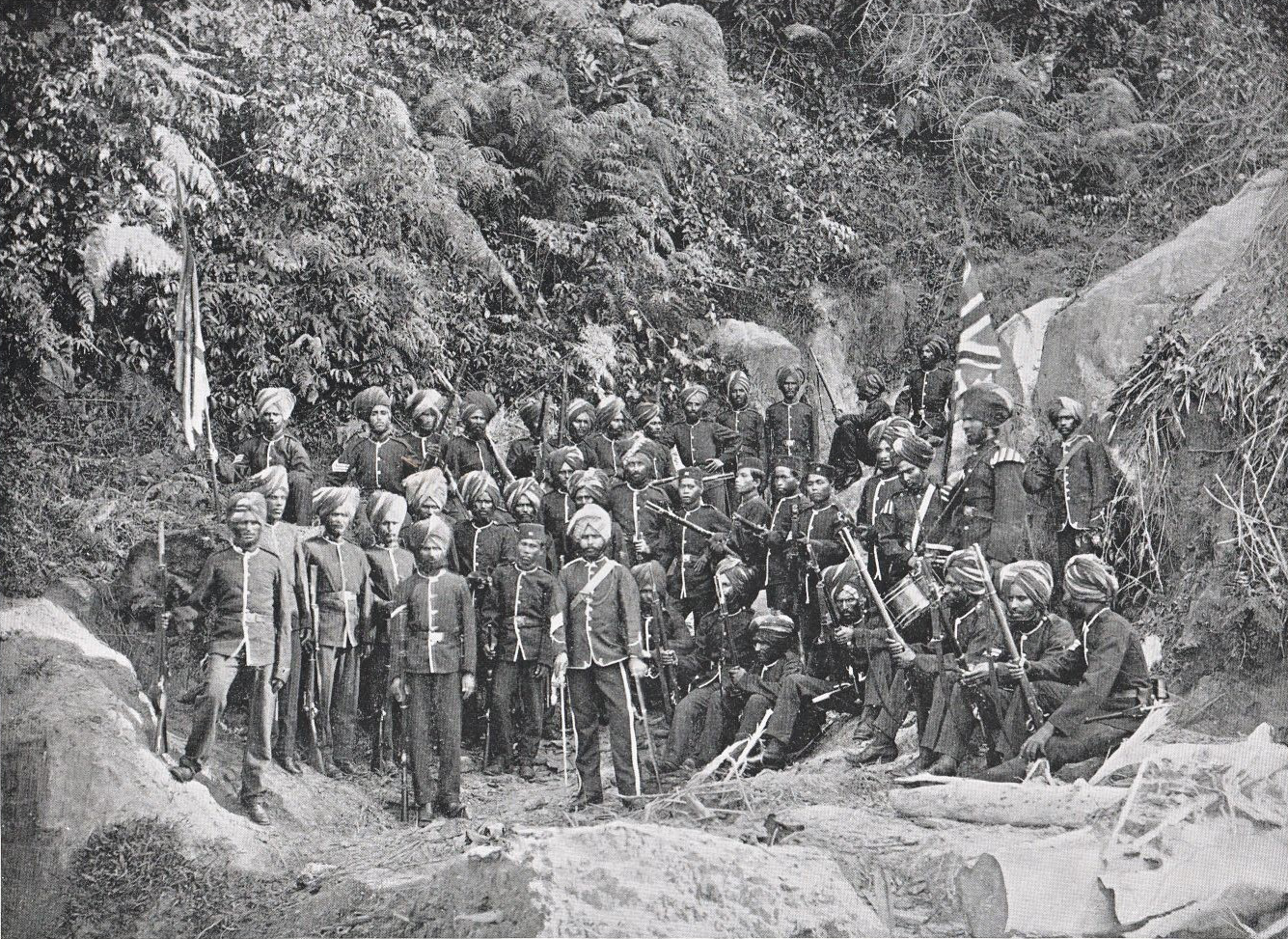
Members of the Indian Police, often referred to as the Sikh Constabulary, were some of the most highly decorated police officers throughout the history of North Borneo. However, within the Indian Police there were also Rajput, Muslim Punjabi, Pathans and many other ethnic groups from India.

Initially, the corps of non-commissioned officers (NCOs) and their enlisted constables were almost exclusively non-white. Foreign constables were imported from elsewhere in the British Empire, including a large contingent of Sihks brought from the British Raj and Perak, Dyaks from the Crown Colony of Labuan and elsewhere, Somalis from British Somaliland, and Malays from throughout the South China Sea. There were also at least several Chinese constables. Into the turn of the century, the constabulary employed Dusuns, Muruts, Tegaas, Sea Dyaks, and other local tribes. In the year 1957, the Constabulary employed 566 Dusuns, 155 Muruts, 4 Malays, 31 Chinese, 11 Indians, 9 Pakistani, 17 Sikhs, 74 Bruneis, and 104 people of other ethnicity (Dyaks are not mentioned in the 1957 report).

After the establishment of the Police Training School, the Constabulary became mostly composed of local tribes, including local Dyaks. However, the Dyaks were not the only tribal corps employed by the Constabulary, as especially notably are the Bajau and Orang Laut who were employed along the north coast for their speciality in anti-piracy operations.

In 1916, the Company created the Volunteer Corps, but this was disbanded in 1920. In July 1938, the North Borneo Volunteer Force was created as a supplement to the Constabulary with two platoons of 50 men; one at Sandakan and the other at Jesselton. The Volunteer Force employed many Chinese people, enough to make up two full companies of soldiers. When the Attack on Pearl Harbor took place, the combined forces of the Constabulary and the Volunteer Force was 650 men. The governor requested an extra battalion from the Crown, but there were none available, so he increased the force by 50 men.

== Organisation ==
The Governor of North Borneo was the Commander-in-chief of North Borneo, and the ultimate authority over the Constabulary. Underneath the Governor, in the hierarchy of military and police matters, were Company-appointed – Crown-appointed after 1946 – government officers known as Residents, who were in charge of the Residencies of North Borneo. District Officers (D.O.'s) were responsible for managing the military and police matters of each district.

Charles Bruce writes that:

"The term "District Officer" probably conveys little or nothing to the generality of my readers... In the early nineteen hundreds, a District Officer in North Borneo had to assist him in his job probably one Malay-speaking clerk and twenty police. With this staff he had to administer an area of possibly two thousand square miles and a population of perhaps ten thousand. He was to all intents and purposes the untrammeled king of this realm. Although hardly out of his teens, the bounds to his sway – at any rate in the remoter districts – were mainly theoretical. Various codes of law were there to guide him in court, it is true, but their provisions were not too rigidly followed, and custom tempered with common sense played a prominent part in the administration of justice. A monthly report was expected, but more as a pious hope than as a really serious obligation."

=== Commandants and Commissioners ===
The Constabulary itself was led by a Commandant of the Constabulary, which was a title, not a rank. Commandants were usually gazetted as Captain within the British Armed Forces. For some years, this person also served as the Inspector of Prisons. As policing in the British Empire evolved, the Constabulary evolved with different positions, such as the superintendent ranks. By at least the 1960s, the position of Commandant was replaced by the rank of Police Commissioner.

The first Commandant of the Constabulary was Arthur Montgomery Harington, the grandson of the Reverend Charles Sumner Harington. Harington was recruited from the Rifle Brigade, where he maintained his commission during his tenure in Borneo. He resigned in 1883 out of disgruntlement with his bosses and their lack of willingness to supply funds and personnel to the Constabulary. Harington later became the Commandant of the Constabulary in Alexandria, before moving to London. In London, at the end of his life, Harington served as the Managing Director for the Langkon North Boreno Rubber Company at Threadneedle Street.

Arthur Harington's nephew was Charles H. Harington, who was the longest-serving Commandant of the Constabulary.

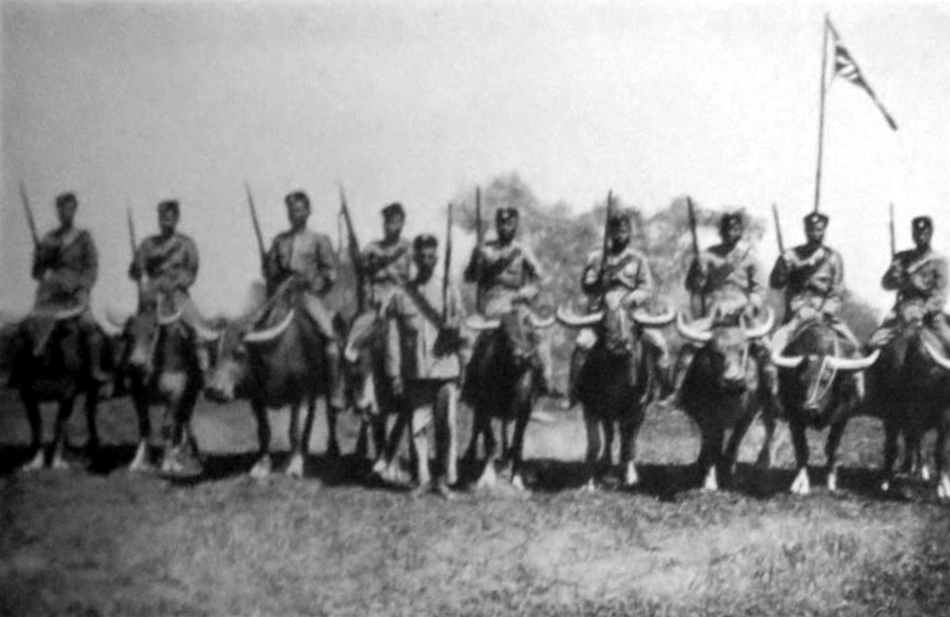
The Flying Squad were a unit of mounted constables who patrolled their sector on buffaloes.

By the year 1960, the commissioner of the North Borneo Police Force commanded the following branches;

- Prisons
- Special Branch
- Criminal Investigations Department
- Police Band
- Immigration Department
- Road Transport
- Marine Police Branch
- Police Training School

== History ==
=== Anti-piracy operations and Marine Branch ===
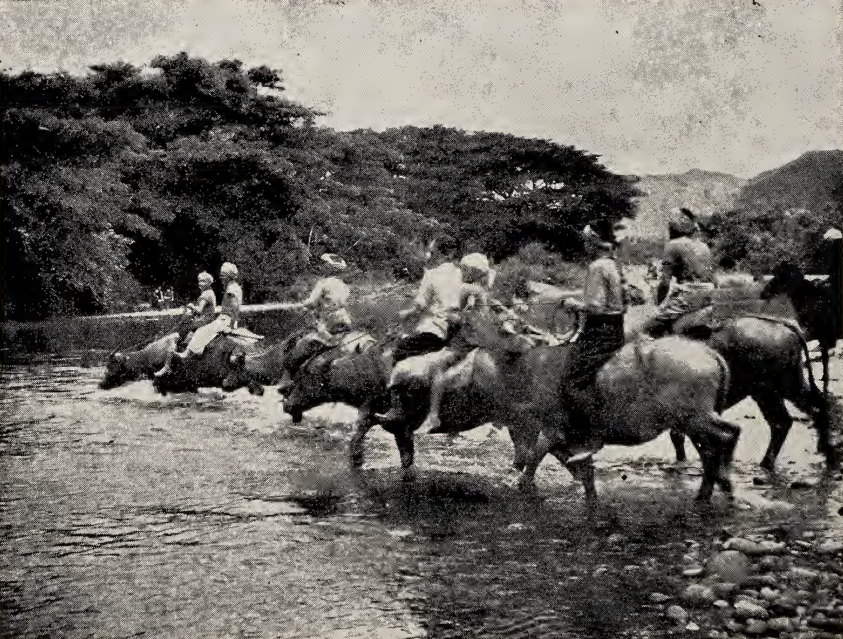
The Bajau Police, seen here in 1950 performing transportation security, were incorporated into the Constabulary as a special unit that carried out anti-piracy and anti-smuggling operations throughout the colony, a function this tribe has provided Sabah since prehistory.

Fighting piracy was one of the Constabulary's primary functions from its inception, and as such, it had a close connection to both the Royal Navy, and had its own maritime patrols. One people-group particularly associated with piracy in the region were the Illanun, who would regularly target schooners of both the Dutch operating out of Batavia, Java, and the British at Singapore. The colonial newspaper of the Straits Settlement, The Daily Times, during the 1870's labeled them as "almost exclusively devoted to piracy," written over thirty years after their villages in West Borneo were burned by Sir Thomas Cochrane, whereafter the pirates retreated to the Tungku River and Tungku in East Borneo. From before the establishment of the colony at Sabah, the local Bajau people living here also thought of the Illanun people as an oppositional force. Owen Rutter writes:

"There is no love lost between the Bajaus and the Illanuns. The Bajaus believe that the lllanuns have occult powers, enabling them to turn themselves into fish and to become evil spirits at will; that they chiefly delight in eating the flesh of corpses, and a continuous watch is kept over the dying or the newly-dead to balk these human vultures of their prey."

Another "piratical group" mentioned in the 1870's were known as the Balignini (also sometimes called Balinini or Balanguini), who have been categorized as a subgroup of the Bajau people.

Many faux-anthropological descriptions, however, must be read with caution as to the colonial age in which they were written, especially that of W. B. Pryer, who describes the Bajau as "...a curious wandering, irresponsible sort of race, rather low down in the scale of humanity, and live almost entirely in boats, in families." While descriptive of the people group being a sea-fairing culture, this is also an overtly racist description, and must be consumed with caution.

When North Borneo was in the process of obtaining its charter, Henry Richard expressed great concerns that these "pirate" attacks in the area of the Sulu Sea were not acts of piracy at all. He lamented to William Gladstone that James Brooke, the White Rajah of Sarawak, had used the excuse of piracy to commit "...one of the most frightful and wholesale massacres of Natives that is recorded in history." Instead, when the Parliament of the United Kingdom debated this issue, Richard said:

"Well, when this now Company gets into difficulties with their subjects or other Native Tribes, what will then happen? Why, a loud outcry is sure to be raised in the country, and we shall be told—

"There are our dear, helpless countrymen attacked or besieged by barbarous savages, and we must go to their rescue."

And so we shall be obliged to espouse their quarrels and to fight their battles, just or unjust. Now, I protest against being dragged into these responsibilities. I say again, what I said last year, when I brought forward a Motion on a similar subject—this nation of 35,000,000 of people ought to be master of its own destinies, instead of its blood and treasure and reputation being placed at the mercy of others without the knowledge or consent of people or Parliament."

— ~ Henry Richard

==== Semporna pirate attack (1954) ====
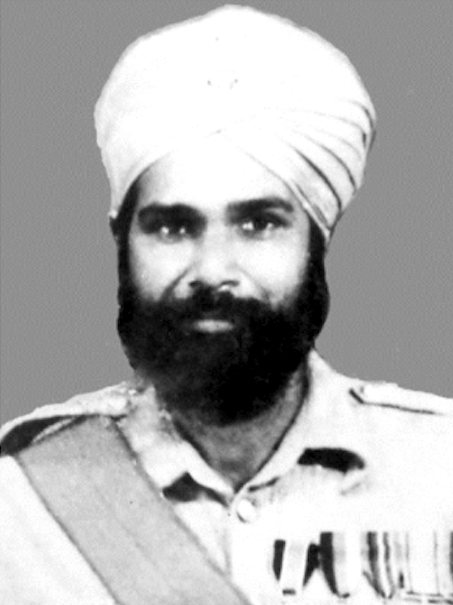
Sergeant Sagar Singh was posthumously awarded a Member of the Order of the British Empire.

On 29 March 1954, two kumpits of Moro pirates, armed with fully automatic rifles, landed at the jetty in the costal town of Semporna. Members of the NBPF defended the town, but several were killed. Forrest Department officer named T.R. Barnard was buried the next day at Lahad Datu. Posthumously, Singh was awarded as a Member of the Order of the British Empire.

==== Merger with Malaysia ====
Just prior to the Colony's merger with Malaysia in 1963, a British officer from the Marine Police Branch told a reporter from The New Yorker that:

"They're a raggle-taggle lot, these pirate fellows, and when you do catch up with them, you find that they're knock-kneed, cross-eyed, unshaven, and mean, and you can't get a word out of them. It's an odd thing, chasing pirates in a world where so much of great importance is going on—nuclear bombs and spaceships and new nations like Malaysia—but I've rather taken a fancy to it."

=== Colonial expeditions (1881–1915) ===
==== Puroh Expedition (1883) ====
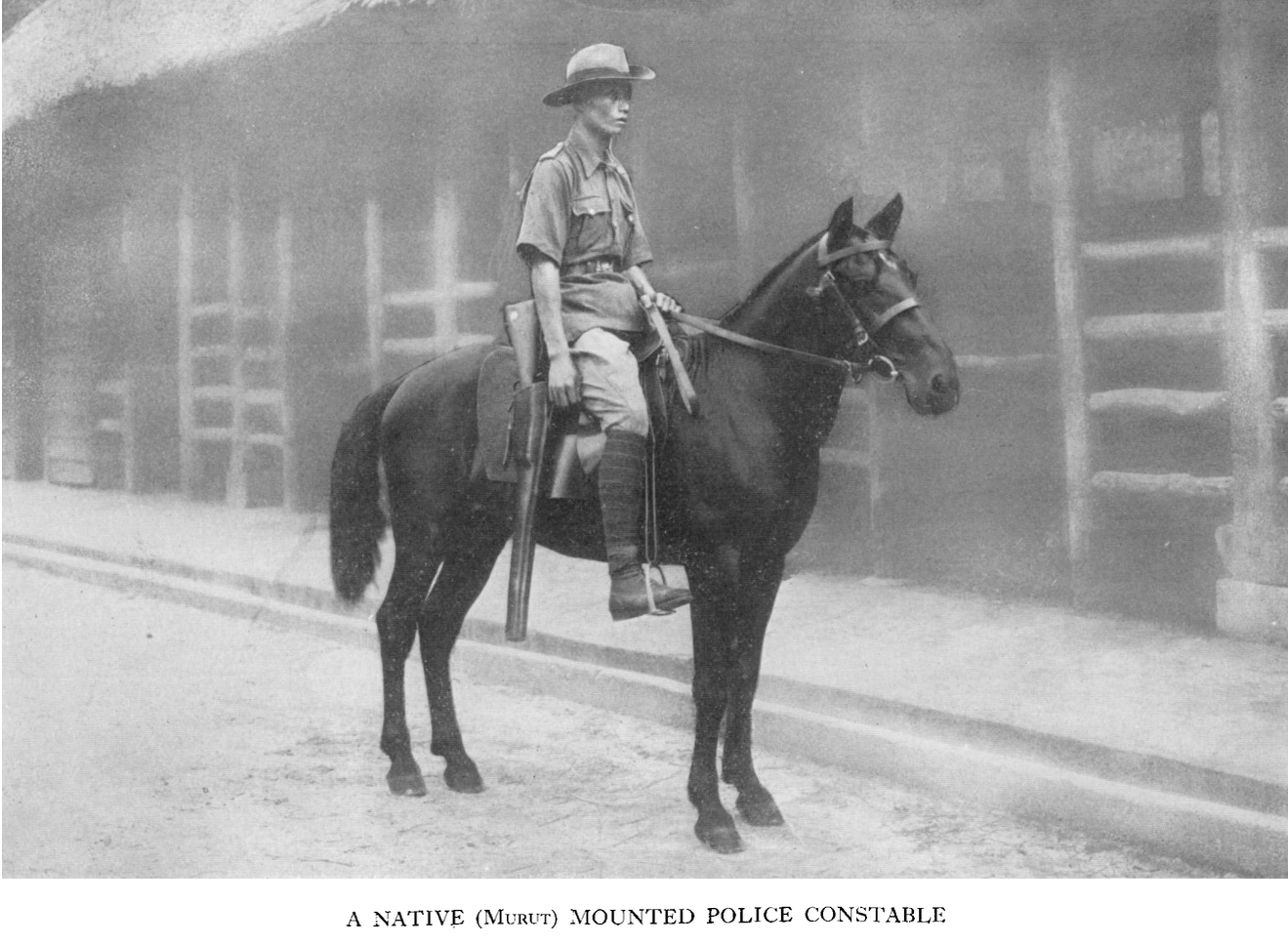
In the Constabulary's early years, "native" officers stationed in rural villages were the "right-hand-man of the District Officer," and they acted as both police officers and civil servants.

The Puroh Expedition was the first major inland expedition of the Constabulary against a local uprising force, initially engaged as a punitive mission to prosecute the murder of a Brunei trader in the village of Puroh. The expeditionary force was around 50 strong, led by the Commandant, Chief Inspector A. M. de Fontaine, accompanied by the Residents of Gaya and Papar and Sandakan, G. L. Davies and R. M. Little. They marched out from Kimanis on 14 October 1883, and took 4 days to march over the mountains, along the Kimanis River, and across the Limbawan Plain to reach Puroh.

The force was then joined by locals from the surrounding areas as they camped for two days. They arrived at the village of Puroh on 20 October and took twelve prisoners. The British commanders authorized the local Limbawan tribes to burn the village to the ground. The fugitives, however, had already fled the village by the time that the expedition arrived, and no major battle occurred.

==== Ambushed at Kawang (1885) ====
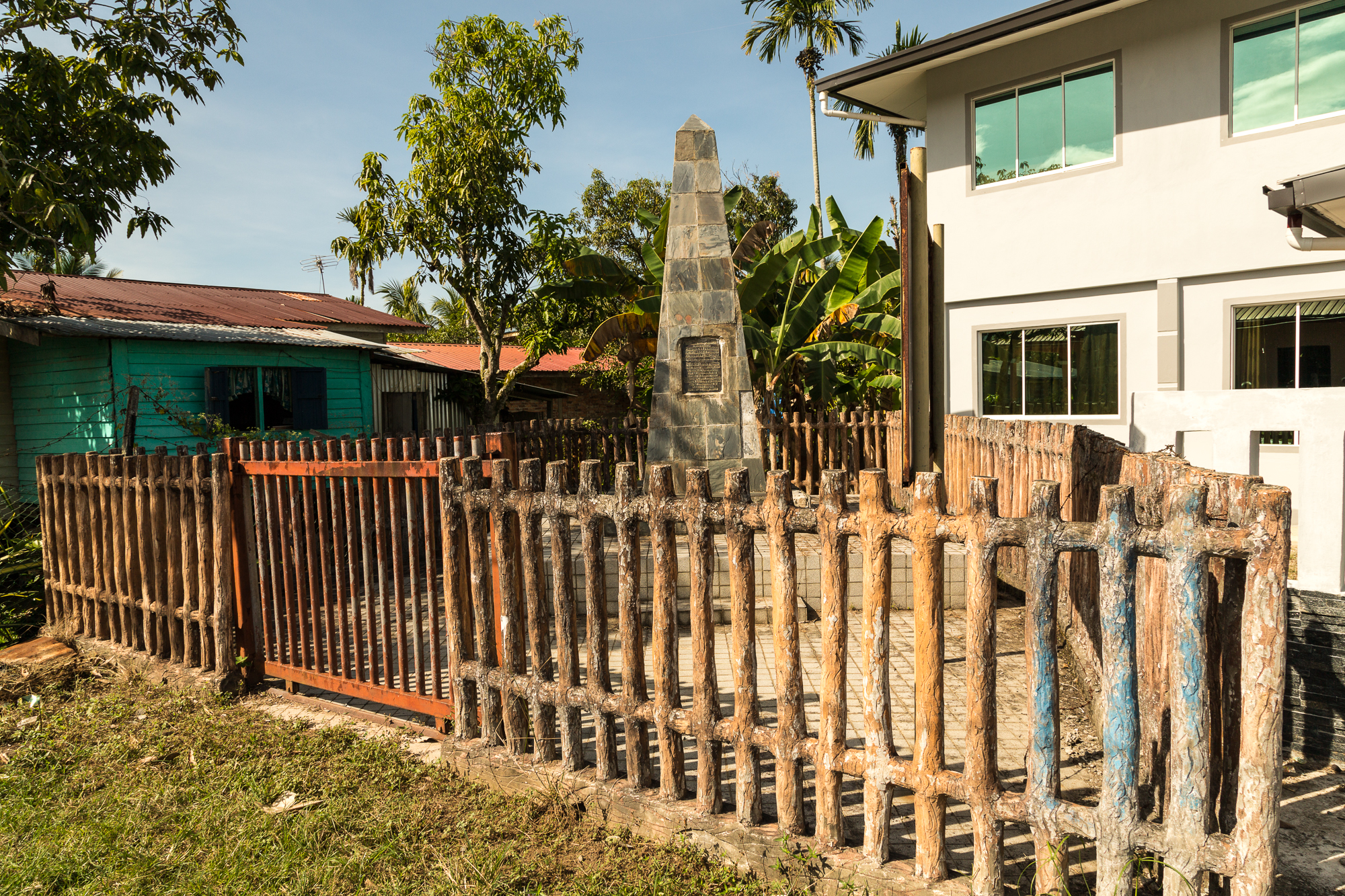
The De Fontaine Memorial was erected to memoiralise the Company employees who lost their lives at Kawang

In 1885, two years after the Puroh Expedition, a notorious Tegas cattle rustler from the Crocker Range named Kandurong was hiding-out in the village of Kawang. To bring him to justice, Commandant A. M. de Fontaine led a punitive expedition with a detachment of the Constabulary, arriving in the village on 10 May 1885. Joining De Fontaine at the head of the column were G. L. Davies, W. Manson Fraser, R. M. Little and J. E. G. Wheatley. Two days later, a battle ensued, and, around a dozen Bajau and 5 members of the Constabulary were killed.

==== Omaddal Expedition (1886) ====
Shortly after the establishment of North Borneo, the Company realized the profit that could be made from making a monopoly out of the local profitable trade in edible bird's nests, the main ingredient in bird's nest soup. It was the idea of Resident William Burgess Pryer to collect 20% duties on these nests, and have them all funneled through the markets at Elopura or Silam, to then be re-sold. The island of Omaddal refused to take part in this arrangement, and began systematically attacking Company trading posts, the villages of Company-friendly tribes like the Era'an, and the market at Silam.

In 1886, Governor Treacher requested assistance from Captain A. K. Hope and the HMS Zephyr (1873) to advance on Omaddal. The Zephyr, when it arrived, fired on the island. It also carried with it a contingent of Constabulary forces which landed on the island and destroyed several villages. That contingent was commanded by William Raffles Flint.

===== Padas Damit Expedition (1888–1889) =====
In the mid 1880's, a territorial dispute between Pengiran Shabandar, his half-sister Fathima, the Sultan of Brunei, and the British North Borneo Company occurred regarding the area of Padas Damit, a forest reserve along the Padas River in the Klias Peninsula. The territorial dispute between the four vested parties resulted in what the Constabulary called the Padas Damit Expedition, the Constabulary's name for the Padas Damit War, which maintained heavy fighting along the river and in the jungles between December 1888 and May 1889.

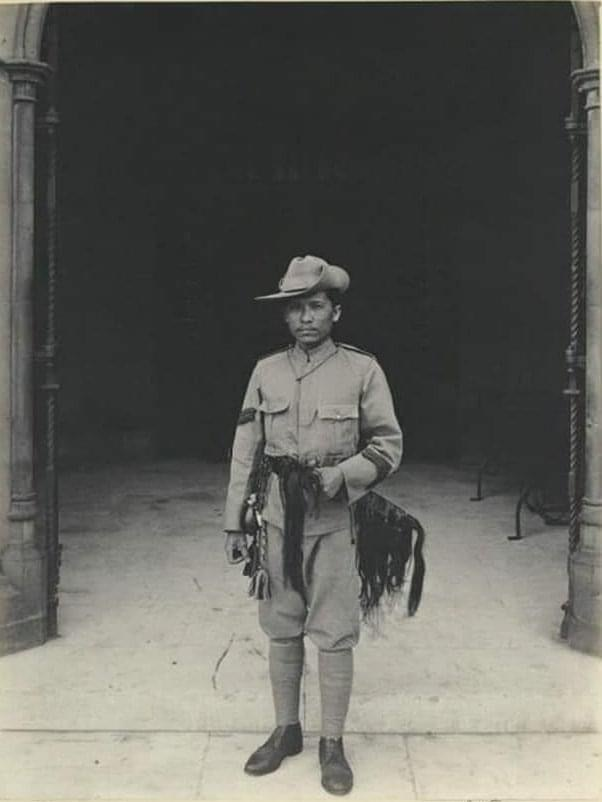
Corporal Laxton in his Constabulary uniform.

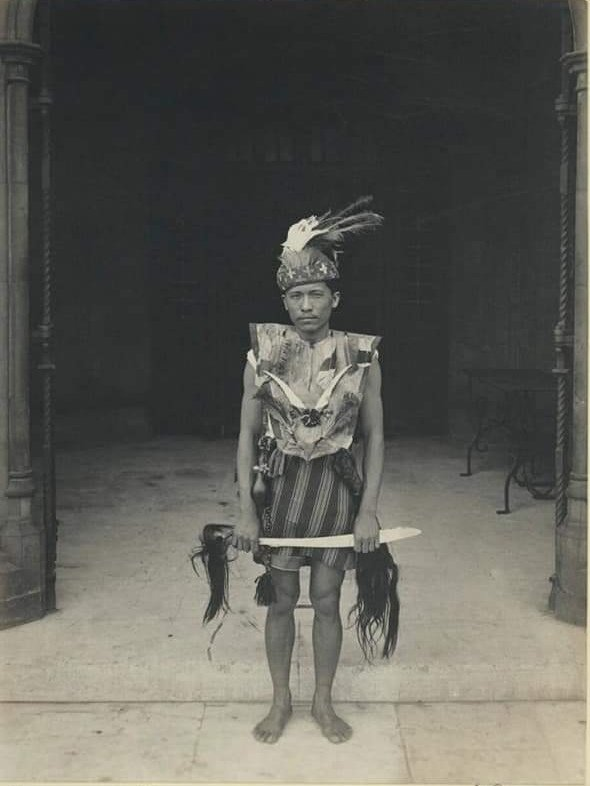
Corporal Laxton in formal attire.

Around a decade after the end of the Padas Damit Expedition, the city of Beaufort and Beaufort District was established in roughly the area where Padas Damit had been.

==== Sigunting War (1894–1901) ====
In 1894, Sigunting, a Rungus Dusun man of the village of Mumus, Serinism, in the modern day Kinabalu Park, launched a seven-year rebellion against colonial rule. This came to be known as the Sigunting War. The Constabulary was called to quash the rebellion, and it did on several occasions, but Sigunting survived through the end of the war to negotiate an official surrender. His rebellion, however, inspired many in the colony to launch rebellions of their own – most of them short-lived and ill equipped, lasting less than a day. However, in 1896, another man rose up in another part of the colony named Mat Salleh.

==== Kwijau Rebellion (1896) ====
In 1896, the Kwijau tribe living in the hills above what was then called the Keningau Plain, Keningau District, launched a rebellion against Company rule. The District Officer, E. H. Barraut, received intelligence that they were planning an attack. He called Sandakan requesting assistance, but the Kwijau, however, had blocked the roads into town.

Instead of waiting to repel an attack, some local Murut chiefs convinced Barraut to go on the offensive and attack the Kwijau instead. He took his Constabulary detachment and surrounded one of the Kwijau villages, demanding their surrender. They did not surrender, and Barraut successfully attacked it.

He did the same for another Kwijau village, and gave the rest of the tribe a week to capitulate. The Kwijau surrendered before the week was out.

Reinforcements under the command of P. Wise arrived from Labuan, but the rebellion had already been quashed. Eight Kwijau chiefs were arrested, tried, and sentenced to imprisonment. The rest of the Kwijau tribe swore allegiance to the Company and surrendered in a Planting of the Stone ceremony.

The 200 remaining Kwijau men were then put to work installing telegraphy cables and lines from Tenom to Kimanis. Gunsanad was then appointed to the position of "Government chief."

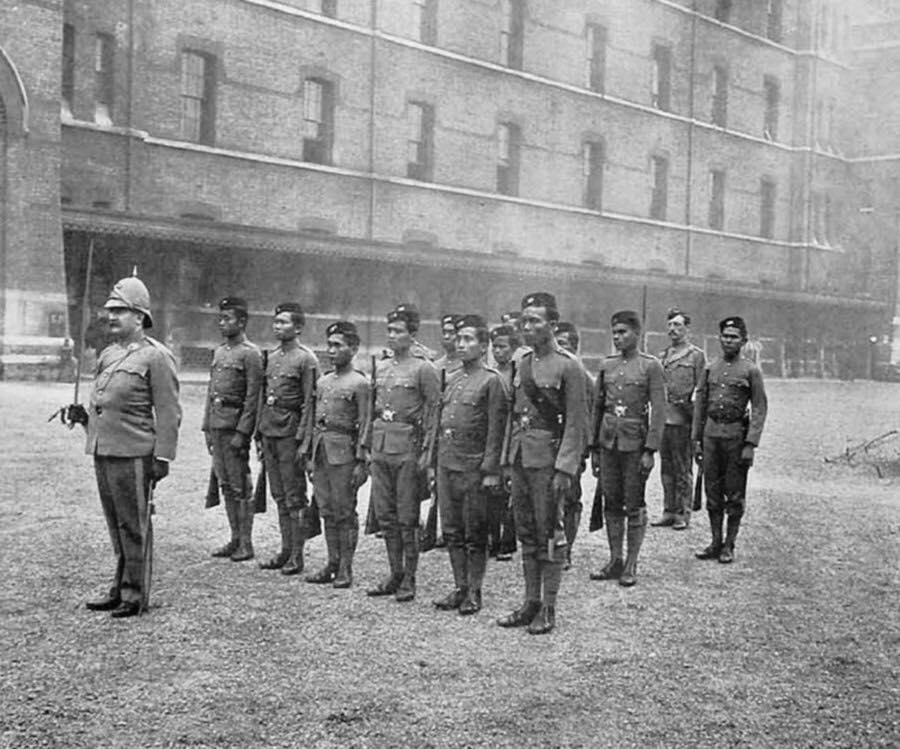
Commandant William Raffles Flint lead a contingent of the Constabulary to march in the Diamond Jubilee of Queen Victoria.

==== First Punitive Expedition ====
Perhaps the most well-known expeditions of the British North Borneo Constabulary were a series of expeditions against Mat Salleh, a local guerrilla freedom fighter and leader of the Mat Salleh Rebellion. Several expeditions were levied against him.

The First Punitive Expedition in 1897 was led by Commandant J. M. Reddie and Governor Beaufort against Mat Salleh, who had a fort constructed at Ranau. This expedition marched in and crushed the early phase of the rebellion, but Mat Salleh escaped. The Punitive Expedition Medal was awarded for this expedition. Battles which occurred during the First Punitive Expedition include; Inanam in July 1897, Ranau in August 1897, December 1897, and January 1897, Ambong in 1897, and Labuk and Suglut through the years 1897 and 1898. The Constabulary Adjutant, A. Jones, was killed in action at Ranau.

Other expeditions against "malcontents or fugitives from justice" in the early years included the Kwong Raid.

==== Tambunan Expedition ====
Commandant Harington led the Tambunan Expedition, which killed Mat Salleh, leader of the Mat Salleh Rebellion.

The 1899–1900 expedition which finally killed Mat Salleh, and his chief of staff, Mat Sator, was known as the Tambunan Expedition, led by Commandant C. H. Harington. Harington fell ill with fever during the expedition, and several missions were led by his sub-commandant, Claude Dansey, including the assault on the fort of Mat Sator. Harington recovered from his fever and resumed command, and the Constabulary launched an attack on Salleh's fortress in the Tambunan Valley, Tambunan District.

The Tambunan Expedition Medal was awarded to those that participated. The Mat Sator Museum now stands where Mat Sator's fort was burned by Claude Dansey, and the Mat Salleh Memorial once stood where Mat Salleh was killed. Both of them are considered "heroes of Sabah," by many local residents.

==== Kudat Raid (1900) ====
Despite Mat Sator being burned with his fort crashing in around him at Tambunan, he did survive to lead another battle against the Company at the town of Kudat. He was, however, killed here alongside Mat Daud, another leader of the Mat Salleh Rebellion.

==== Blayong Rebellion (1914) ====
Between June and July 1914, Blayong led a rebellion against Company rule that was known as the Blayong Rebellion or the Blayong Uprising.

==== Rundum Expedition (1915) ====
In 1915, Ingkun and Antanum, among others, led the Rundum Rebellion against Company rule in the Rundum District, the most-remote district in North Borneo. This was the single-largest coordinated campaign against the Company in history, involving over 60 villages and thousands of Murut warriors. The Constabulary, after an initial battle, engaged several small units on the Rundum Expedition to quell the rebellion.

=== World War II ===
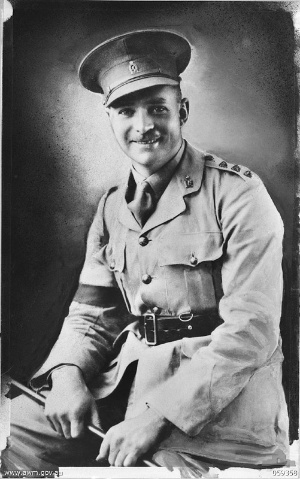
Lionel Matthews was given the "clandestine" command of the Constabulary when Alan Rice-Oxley was sent to Kuching in January 1943. He was shot and killed by the Japanese.

==== Sandakan Resistance ====
On 19 January 1942, Governor Robert Smith, acting on orders received from the British, capitulated and surrendered to the Empire of Japan. Smith and the other heads of government were ordered by the Japanese to stay in their posts to recall firearms and issue a surrender to the forces of North Borneo. Most of these government administrators were then interred several weeks later at Berhala Island, but some civilians were allowed to stay under house arrest or confined to their villages. Several others were allowed to remain in Sandakan. The administration of Japanese North Borneo officially absorbed the Constabulary. However, the Constabulary secretly remained loyal to their former Commandant, and remained working under secret orders from Governor Smith and the Constabulary commanders interred in the camps around Borneo. The Commandant of the Constabulary, Alan Rice-Oxley, had also been taken to Berhala Island alongside Governor Smith, maintaining the underground continuity of government.

==== Jesselton Resistance ====
Because all of their original command structure was still present, the Constabulary were able to form an effective resistance, sending a detachment of the North Borneo Volunteer Force – a reserve force of the Constabulary – into the jungles to coordinate the activities of the Kinabalu Guerrillas and their leader Albert Kwok.

=== Crown Colony ===
From 12 September 1945 to 1 July 1946, the British Military Administration of Borneo (BMA) worked to restructure the former territory. The final Japanese forces in Borneo surrendered in September, 1945, and an administrative district was installed at Sandakan. A temporary police headquarters was established there, overseen initially by the BMA's Civil Affairs Task Force. Jesselton was also a major hub of BMA policing activity, as they spent the next several years searching for Japanese collaborators.

The Chartered Company was too financially encumbered by the war to continue running the colony.

In 1946, British North Borneo became the Crown Colony of North Borneo, and the British North Borneo Constabulary became a possession of the Crown Colony. As it was now "under the Crown," the Constabulary adopted the symbol of the crown and placed it on top of their badge. The name of the Constabulary at this point was changed to the North Borneo Armed Constabulary. Integration with the Colonial Police Service began at this point.

Only several years later, in 1950, the name was changed to the North Borneo Police Force, which it maintained for the next 13 years.

=== Brunei Revolt (1962) ===
==== Weston attack (December 8) ====
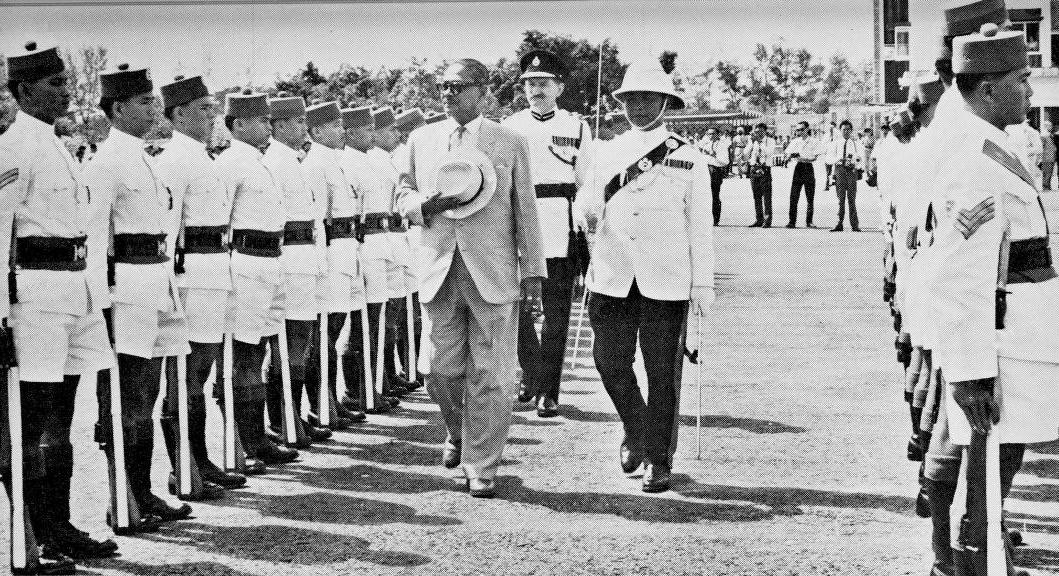
In November 1962, Tunku Abdul Rahman arrived in Jesselton. Upon his arrival, he performed an inspection of the NBPF's Guard of Honour at Jesselton Airport.

In 1962, North Borneo had only just held its first-ever public elections, and was in the process of establishing self-determination. An Inter-Governmental Committee was established to oversee the process in conjunction with the Cobbold Commission. In November 1962, Tunku Abdul Rahman visited the colony on a diplomatic tour. He landed at Jesselton Airport, toured the city, and then left for Sandakan. While in North Borneo, he met with members of the Civil Service, the leading political parties in the colony, and government department heads. After his tour, he left for the Sarawak Colony.

However, intelligence was received at NBPF Special Branch shortly afterward that Tentara Nasional Kalimantan Utara (TKNU) had secured a presence in Brunei Bay, which was at that time in the Lawas District, which was then a part of the Fifth Division of Sarawak. The TKNU at the time, Special Branch intelligence had reported, was being secretly funded by the government of Indonesia to remove the Sultan of Brunei from power. As a precautionary measure, two sections of the Mobile Police Force were deployed to Sipitang, a city on the bay near the border with Sarawak.

On 8 December, when the Brunei Revolt broke out in Brunei and Sarawak, a force of about 60 TKNU fighters rallied in Kampong Lubok, Sipitang. They were armed with shotguns, homemade bombs in cigarette tins, and parangs. They marched into Weston, at the mouth of the Padas River.

When they got to Weston, they took the village constable's Greener riot gun (a single shot shotgun used for door breaching), several more shotguns, and then raised the TKNU flag over the town of Weston. The next day, they gathered more TKNU fighters and marched to Lingkungan, where they encountered a roving patrol of NBPF officers. They exchanged fire with the officers, and one of their number was killed, and retreated back to Kampong Lubok. Within the next few days, most of them surrendered to the NBPF, but 4 TKNU fighters crossed the border into Brunei. More fighters attempted to carry out attacks in the Sipitang District and Sindumin, but there were the two sections of the Mobile Force had already been deployed here, and were able to restore order within two days.

==== Battle at Kuching Airport (December 8) ====
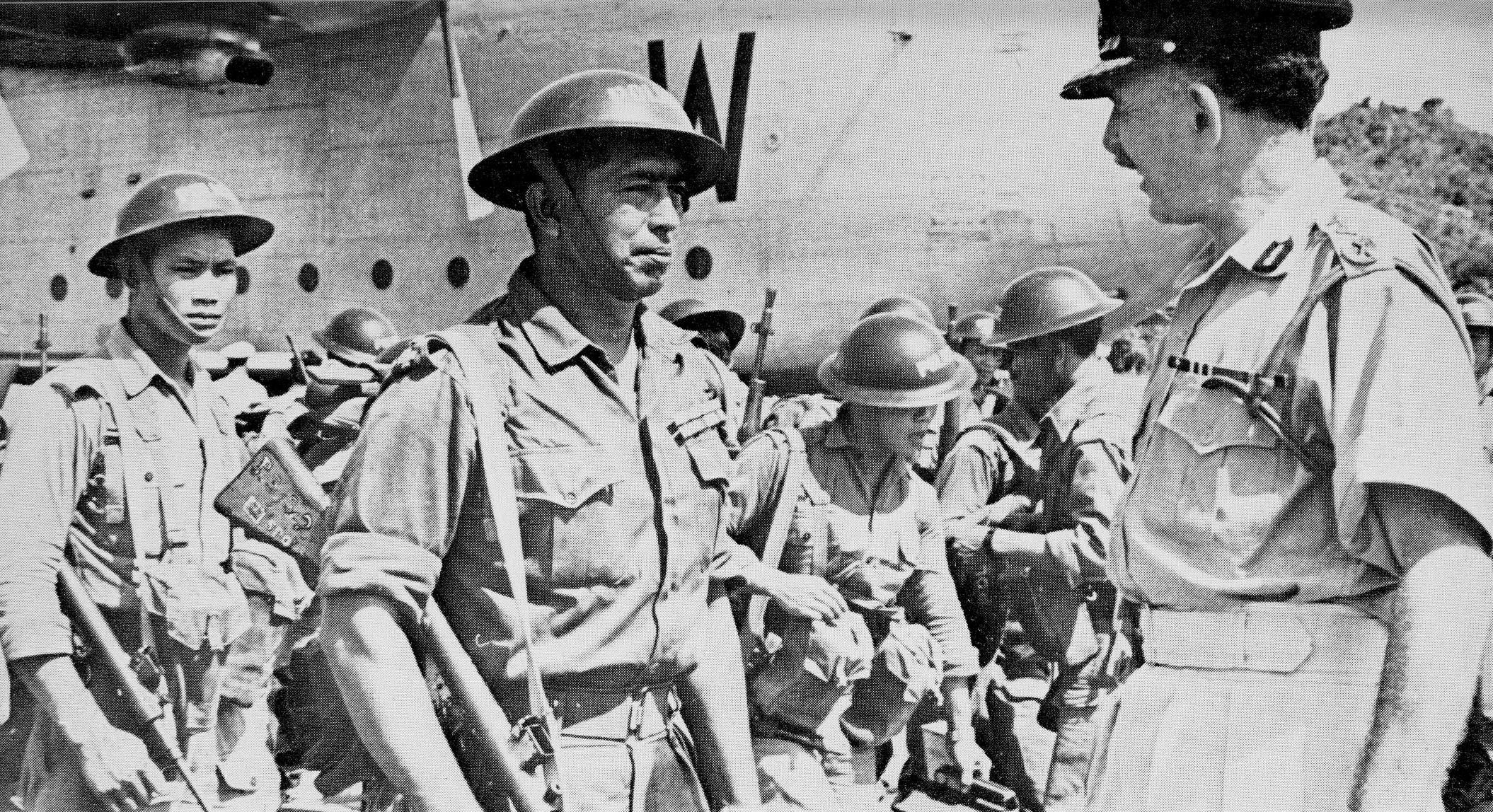
The Mobile Police Force was an elite NBPF rapid-response unit deployed to combat insurgencies throughout Borneo. Here, they are seen unloading from their mission on Brunei on the tarmac of Jesselton Airport. On the right is DCP Plunkett, speaking to Mohd Yusof bin Din Mohamed, the commander of the Mobile Force.

When the news of the Brunei rebellion reached Far East Command, the Police Commissioner deployed a full platoon of the Mobile Police to Brunei, which was at that time attached to the Queen's Own Highlanders performing anti-piracy duties on the East Coast. Under the command of Mohd Yusof bin Din Mohamed, the platoon touched-down in Brunei just before noon on December 8.

At Brunei, they moved to Kuching Airport, defending the airstrip and power station there from a wave of TKNU fighters who descended on them. For several hours, they held the airport and power station, until the arrival of troops from the Gurkha Contingent as their relief. One member of the Mobile Force, PC Bitti, lost his life at Kuching Airport.

== Weaponry ==
When the Constabulary was established in 1881, the standard-issue rifle for all troops was the Martini–Henry rifle. However, native troops on several occasions who were sent to London were seen carrying older-era Snider–Enfields – possibly because they did not need to carry their arms with them on the steamship, and needed to withdraw from the armory upon arriving in England. Also issued to platoon sized elements would be a Maxim gun. During the Punitive Expeditions, the standard cannonry was the Seven-Pounder.

The indigenous tribal members of the Constabulary were also authorised use of their own traditional weaponry, including; blow darts, mandaus, jimpul, langgai tinggang, niabor, pakayun, dohong, pandat, parang latok, among other traditional weaponry.

In the early 20th century, the Martini-Henry was replaced by the Lee–Enfield.

By the 1940's, the kit and equipment sheet for a member of the Constabulary included a short baton, a bayonet, an officer's sword or NCO's sword, a .380 pistol, ammunition, and scabbards.

== Headquarters ==
The first headquarters of the Constabulary were in Kudat, at a place called Fort Hill, but Sandakan was made the capitol of the country in 1883.

Headquarters buildings of the Constabulary through the years
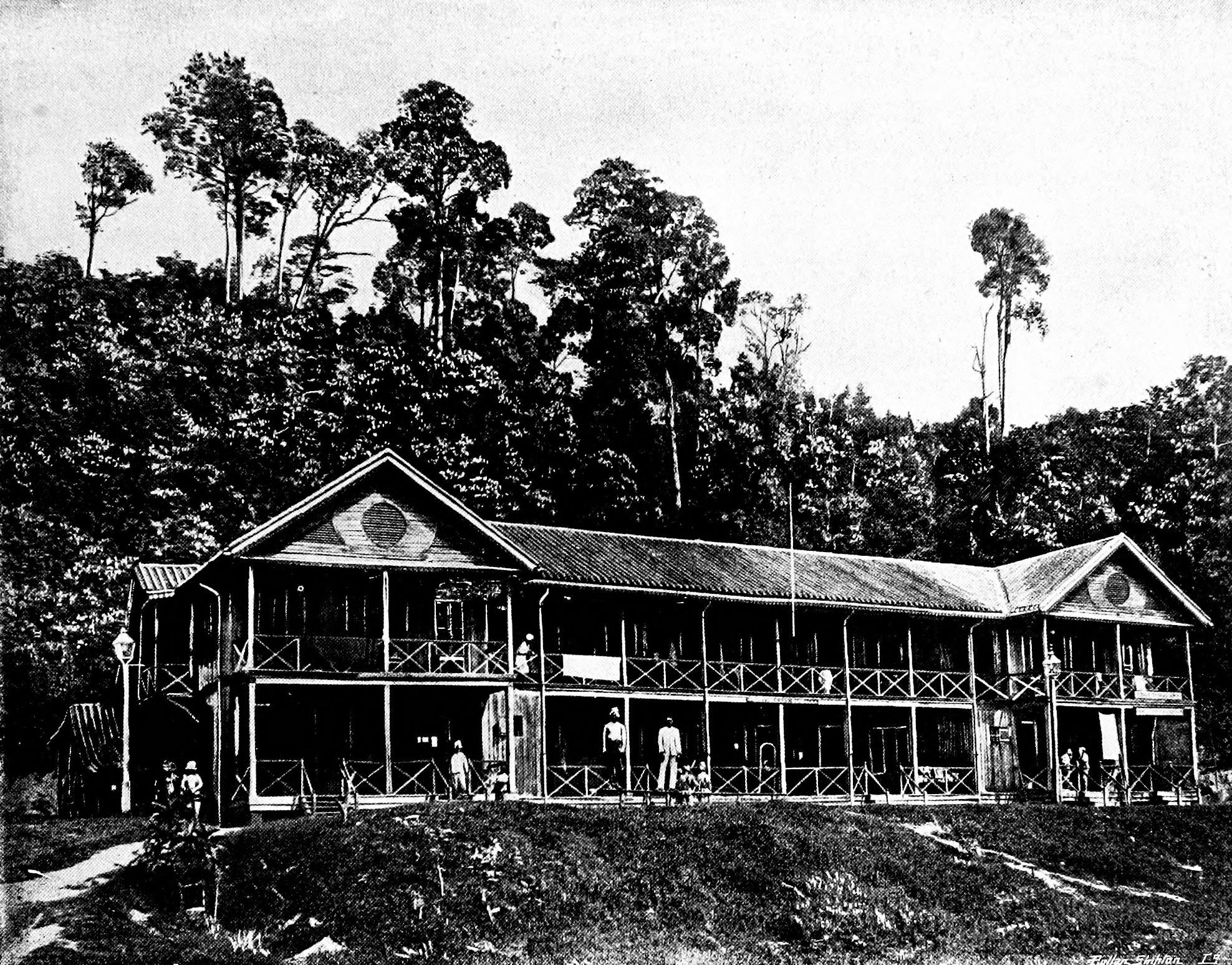
The second headquarters of the British North Borneo Constabulary were established here as The Barracks in Sandakan, before they were moved to Jesselton.

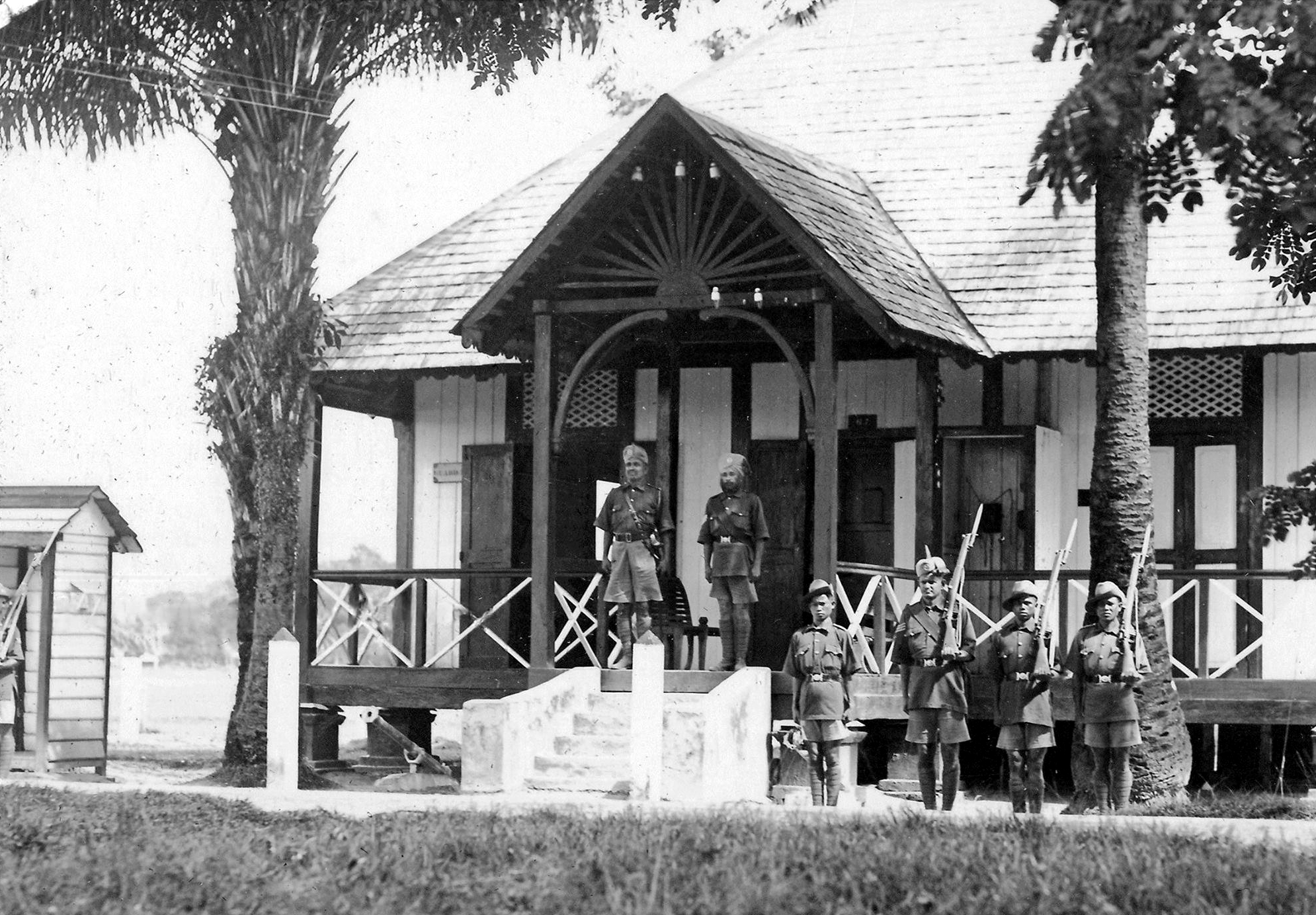
The Victoria Barracks at Jesselton were the third headquarters after the move from Sandakan, built at Batu Tiga, (Mile 3), the third mile marker on the road through town. When they moved to Kepayan, Batu Tiga remained a local police station. During the Second World War, Batu Tiga became a concentration camp.

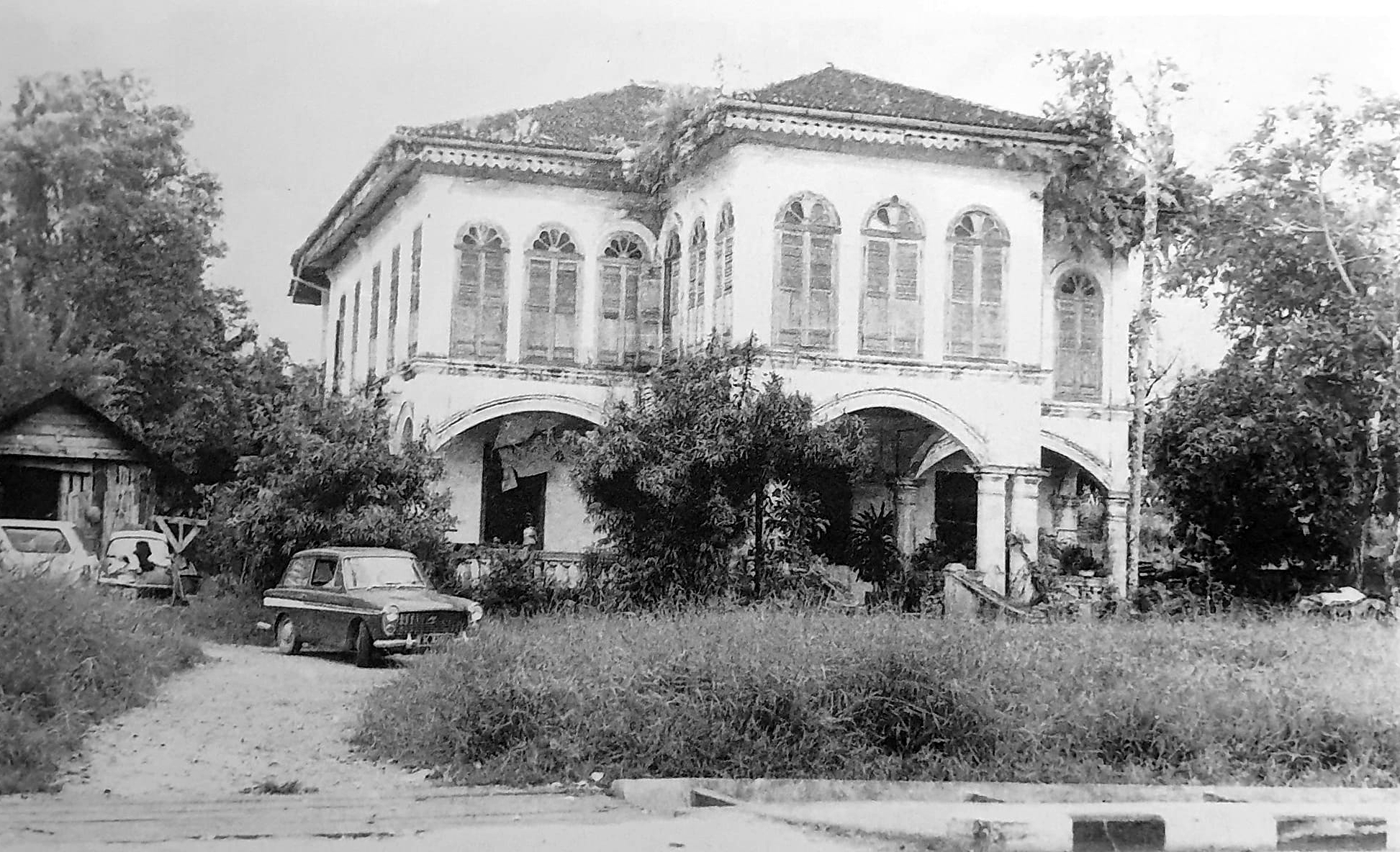
During the reign of Japanese North Borneo, the Kempeitai (Japanese secret police) operated out of these Borneo headquarters at Jawa Road No.1 in Kuching. This building was torn down after the war.

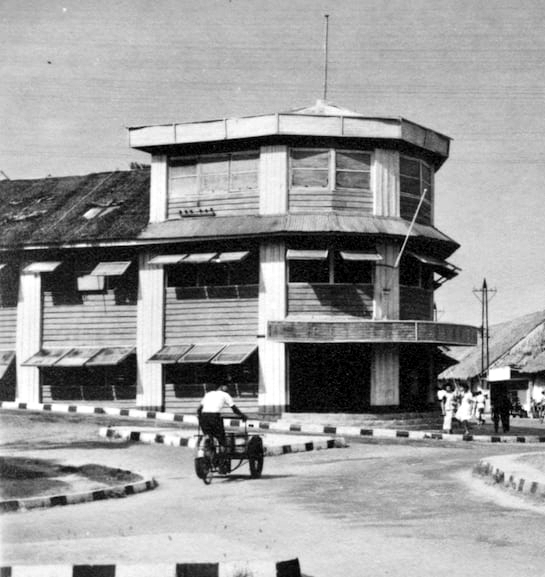
After the Japanese occupation of North Borneo was lifted, the British Military Administration constructed the "temporary" Humphrey Street Police Station in Sandakan in 1946.

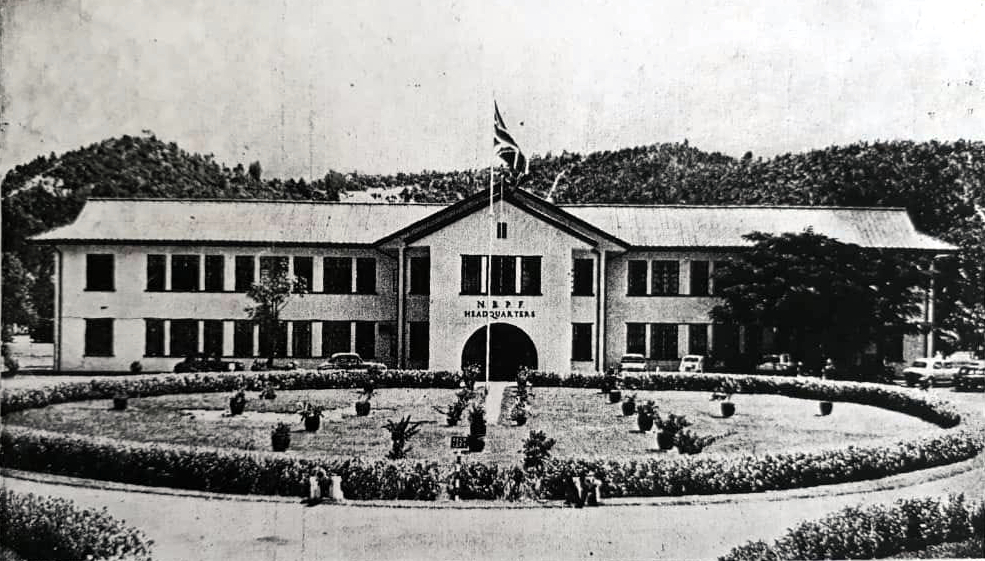
The North Borneo Police Force Headquarters at the Marina Barracks in Kepayan were opened on 10 October 1952, and the last British flag was lowered here on 31 August 1963.

== Ranks ==
19th Century Gazetted Officers
Commandant Captain	Sub-Commandant	Wing Officer	Adjutant

20th Century Gazetted Officers
Commissioner	Deputy Commissioner	Assistant Commissioner	Staff Officer	Deputy Inspector-General

	Other Officers			
Warrant Officer	Superintendent	Assistant Superintendent	Chief Inspector	Inspector

Non-commissioned officers					Junior Enlisted	
Sergeant Major	Sergeant	Corporal	Lance- Corporal	Detective	Constable	Rural Constable

== Controversies ==
=== Sanctioned head hunting ===
The North Borneo Company hired mercenaries from another island to go head hunting in a quite literal sense. With respect to the Constabulary, these hunts were sanctioned and authorised military actions, sponsored for bounty against enemies of the state by the Constabulary. Governor Treacher, upon writing the account of the official history of the colony's first ten years, wrote that that: "...we regard head-hunting as an amusement sanctioned by usage..." These headhunters of Borneo, when hired into the Constabulary, were authorised to carry their swords with the human hair of their victims hanging off of their scabbards. The local tribes saw this as a point of pride and heritage, even carrying these swords in formation at the Diamond Jubilee of Queen Victoria, and at the Coronation of Edward VII and Alexandra. Despite many claims that the Dyaks were the predominate headhunters in the region, other tribes also celebrated the practice, including the Murut people.
