= John Murray Reddie =

British Army officer and Commandant of North Borneo Constabulary (1872–1954)

Colonel, Sir John Murray Reddie CB JP DL
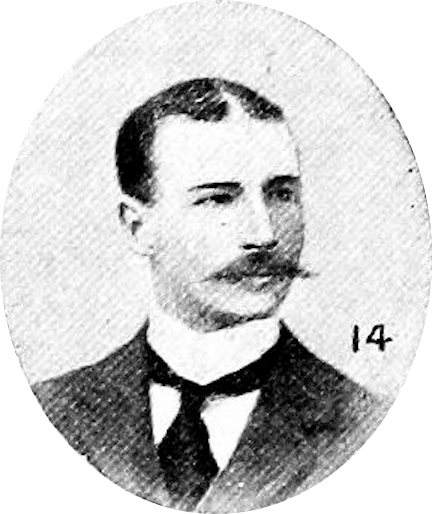

6th Commandant of the British North Borneo Constabulary
- In office 8 February 1897 – April 1899
- Appointed by: Leicester Paul Beaufort
- Preceded by: William Raffles Flint (Acting); Edward Algernon Barnett
- Succeeded by: Charles Herbert Harington

Personal details
- Born: 27 June 1872 Kincardineshire, Scotland, United Kingdom
- Died: 7 September 1954 (aged 82) Worcestershire, England
- Resting place: Kempsey, Worcestershire, England
- Spouse: Dame Constance Catherine Mary Carter (m. 1896)
- Parent: John Griffiths Reddie
- Education: Royal Military Academy Sandhurst
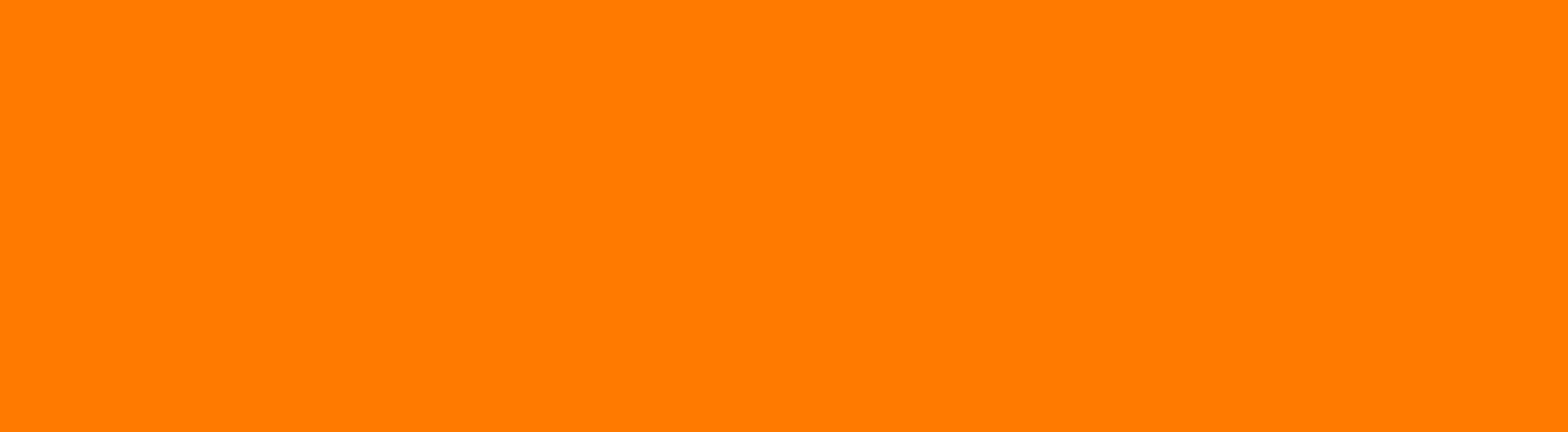
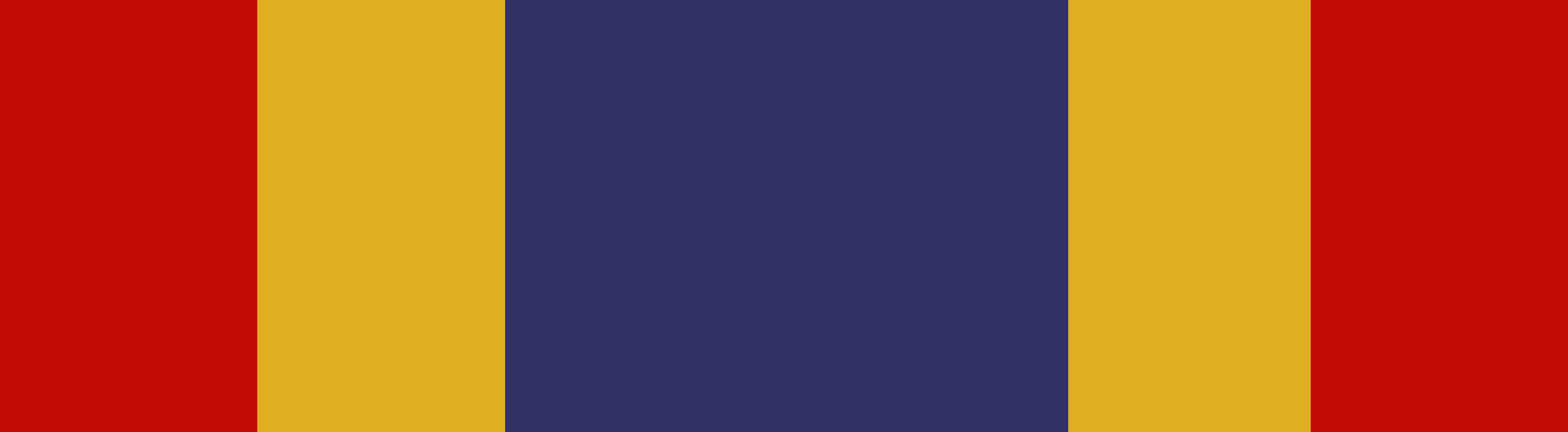
- Awards

Military service
- Branch/service: Worcestershire Regiment; British North Borneo Constabulary
- Rank: Colonel
- Battles/wars: Sigunting War; Mat Salleh Rebellion; World War I

John Murray Reddie was a Scottish soldier who served in various postings of the British Empire, most notably in North Borneo (present day Sabah) as the Commandant of the British North Borneo Constabulary, where he commanded that country's forces during several phases of the Mat Salleh Rebellion.

== Early life and military career ==
John Murray Reddie was born in 1872 somewhere near Rickarton or Fetteresso in the county of Kincardineshire, Scotland, the oldest son of Captain John Griffiths Reddie, originally from Redhouse, Fifeshire. As a child, he entered into the 1878 shooting competition at Nether Aquhollie in Rickarton, where he and his brother Antonie both made it through to the second round.

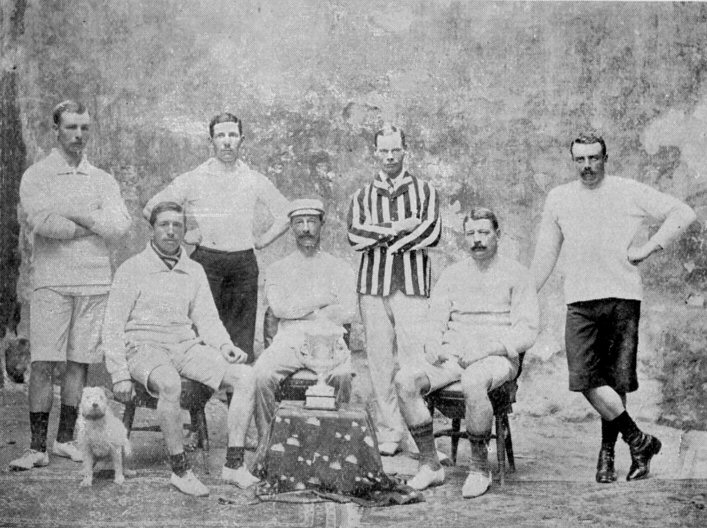
Reddie as a 2nd Lieutenant (standing left) with other members of the 2nd Battalion Worcestershire Regiment Officers Rowing Crew – the team that won the Officer Cup in Malta in 1896.

Reddie was educated in the class of 1892 at Royal Military Academy Sandhurst. In his final year, he played rugby. Reddie and his brother, A. J. Reddie, as members of E Company, were on the winning team of the silver bowl.

On 17 December 1892, he entered into the British Army as a Second Lieutenant in the Worcestershire Regiment. In 1896, the 2nd Battalion was stationed in the Crown Colony of Malta. While stationed in Malta, he rowed crew for the winning team of the Officer Cup.

On 7 January 1896, Reddie married Constance Catherine, the only daughter of Colonel James Colebrooke Carter.

== British North Borneo Constabulary ==
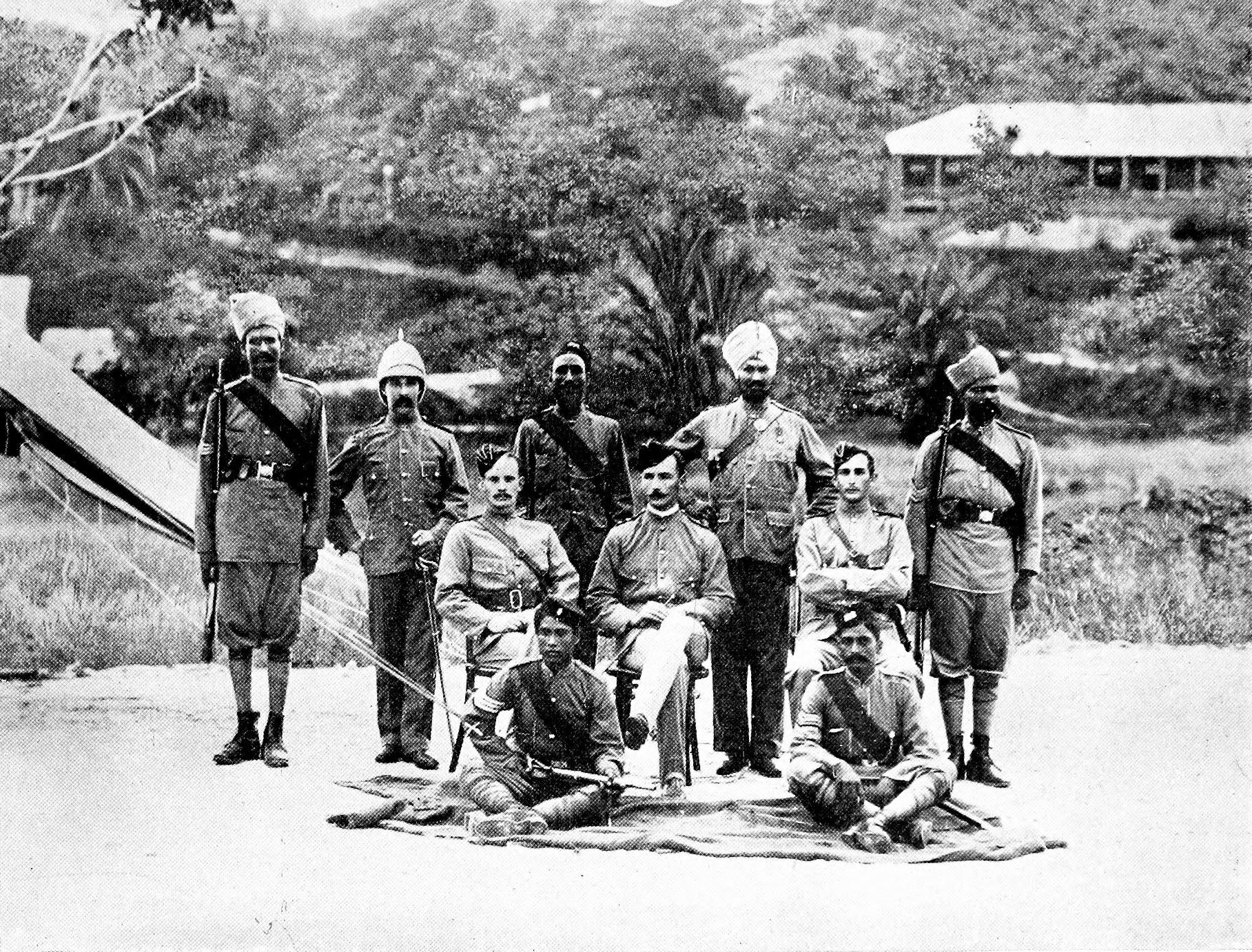
Commandant Reddie (center) and his staff at Sandakan. Seated, left, is Sub-Commandant Charles Herbert Harington, who would later be his replacement as Commandant.

In late 1896, Reddie received word that the posting of Commandant of the British North Borneo Constabulary had become available on the other side of the planet, in the relatively new country of North Borneo (present day Sabah), at the northeastern tip of the island of Borneo. Established in 1881, this was a country governed entirely at the pleasure of a chartered company, the North Borneo Chartered Company. Now in its teens, the country had gone through several minor rebellions and wars.

The Constabulary served a dual function as the sole military and police force of North Borneo. The most recent officeholder – Edward Algernon Barnett – had resigned his commission out of frustration with the Governor of North Borneo and the Company's court of directors. William Raffles Flint had been appointed as Acting Commandant during Barnett's absence, but Flint was in late 1896 preparing to take a contingent of the Constabulary to London to march at the Diamond Jubilee of Queen Victoria, and the country needed a new commanding officer.

After Reddie's promotion to Captain on 19 January 1897, and after a perfunctory interview at the Company's London headquarters on Leadenhall Street, he was seconded from the Worcestershire Regiment to the Constabulary. He and his family arrived in Sandakan via steamship, and Reddie was appointed Commandant of the Constabulary on 8 February 1897.

=== Mat Salleh Rebellion ===
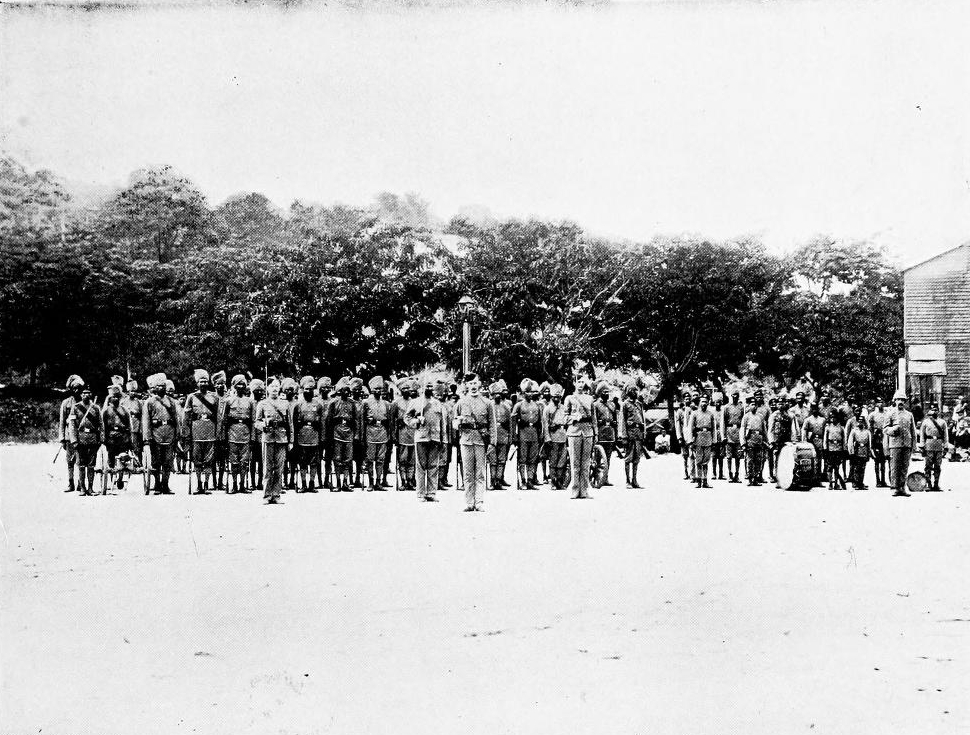
Reddie (center) with the Constabulary formation on the Sandakan fields for a group photo.

When Reddie arrived in the country, the Mat Salleh Rebellion had been an ongoing conflict already for about three years, beginning in 1894. By 1897, Mat Salleh had become the country's most wanted person. Several punitive expeditions against him had already been waged, but the Company had become complacent with a period of relative peace. While he was still at large, the Company did not know that Salleh was preparing for a major escalation in the war. The small party of Iban Constabulary who had been tasked with finding Salleh along the Sugut River had not seen him during their expedition, and by some accounts were taking paychecks without working. Salleh, however, in the Spring months of 1897 was on the Inanam River where he oversaw the construction of four large forts, with his strongest at Ranau, Ranau District.

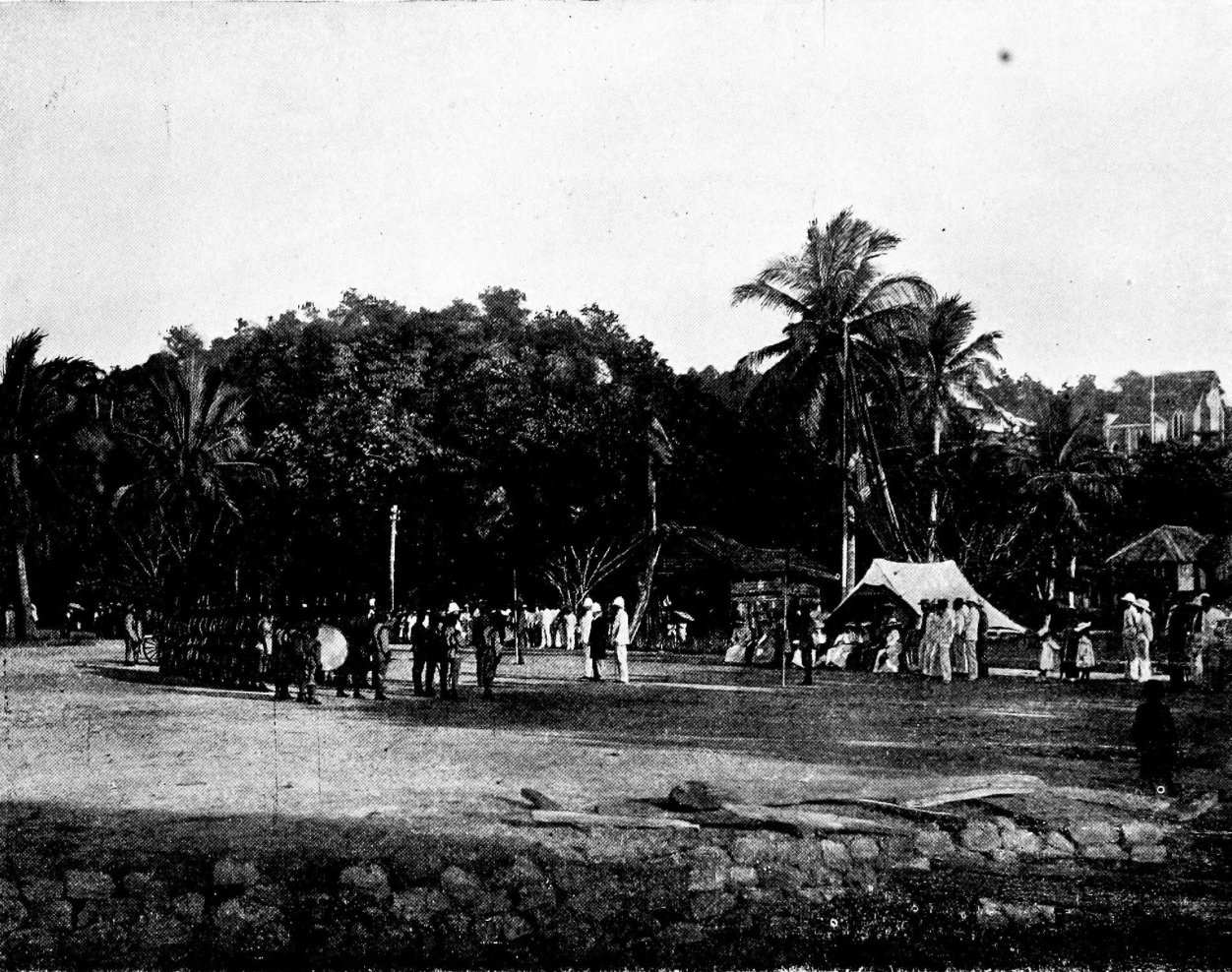
While William Raffles Flint had taken a contingent to march at the Diamond Jubilee of Queen Victoria, a much smaller celebration was held in Sandakan two weeks later. Reddie is seen in the front of the formation on the left of frame.

The government of North Borneo designated 9 July 1897 to be observed as their local celebration of the Diamond Jubilee of Queen Victoria, despite the official event having been observed in London two weeks earlier. Most of the country's government administration gathered in Sandakan, the country's capital city and administrative headquarters. Reddie and his staff of the Constabulary were there, with a guard of honor marching in the Jubilee Parade.

That same day, 9 July, Mat Salleh and his forces sailed to Gaya Island, the Western Residency's administrative headquarters on the other side of the country, and attacked it. No single structure was left standing on the island by the time Salleh's expedition was finished. His forces captured the government's treasurer, the customs clerk, and every Chinese trader living there as prisoners of war. They held the island for 3 days.

At his home on Pulo Tiga, Godfrey Hewett saw dense plumes of smoke rising from Gaya on the 12th. After the attack, a small force mustered and sailed there with all available police from the West Coast.

Governor Beaufort brought Reddie and the Constabulary with him and sailed out of Sandakan as fast as they could. They reached the island on 16 July, but Salleh and his forces had already fled. Reddie and his men set fire to the village anyway. They then sailed up the Inanam River and burned every village they found.

On 9 August 1897, Reddie went out with J. G. G. Wheatley and E. H. Barraut on another expedition to the Sugut River with a contingent of reinforcements. In October 1897, Reddie led an expedition to attack one of Mat Salleh's forts, but it was too heavily defended and they had to retreat to recruit more men.

In April 1899, Reddie resigned his commission as Commandant on account of his "ill-health." Other sources, however, say that he had gotten into a large argument with his superiors.

== Return to England ==
In January 1900, while quartered at Aldershot Garrison, Reddie was ordered to head to Transvaal Colony "on special service," but his doctors outright refused to let him travel outside of England. In 1900, the Worcestershire Regiment was reorganized with two new Regular Battalions, the 3rd and 4th Battalions, with the old 3rd and 4th being renamed the 5th and 6th Battalions. On 14 February 1900, Reddie was made Adjutant of the new 3rd Battalion, remaining at Aldershot, quartered at Blenheim Barracks, North Camp. In the Spring of 1902, the 3rd Battalion moved to Tipperary Barracks, Tipperary. Early in May, the 3rd was presented with its colours by Prince Arthur, Duke of Connaught and Strathearn.

In 1904, Reddie was appointed Captain commanding of the 1st Renfrewshire Volunteer Battalion of the Argyll and Sutherland Highlanders.

=== Territorial Association and veterans affairs ===
By 1915, with the rapid buildup of troops in England after the British entry into World War I, Major Reddie was appointed as County Secretary of the Worcestershire Territorial Association, the Worcestershire County branch of the Council of County Territorial Associations, encouraging young men to volunteer at their local recruiting office to fight in World War I.

During the war, Reddie also served as the Chairman of the Worcestershire Regiment's Comfort and Prisoner of War Funds. In this position, he distributed "comforts" to the Territorial Forces.

Reddie's brother, A. J. Reddie, was deployed to the continent where he fought at the Flanders Fields.

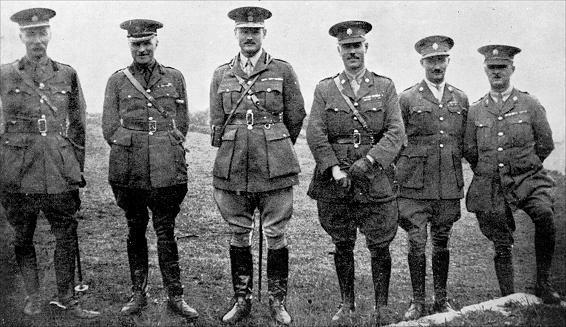
Major Reddie (left) with other officers of the 8th Battalion, Worcestershire Regiment at Swanage for Annual training in 1924.

On 2 December 1917, Murray was made a Companion of the Order of the Bath, with the official date of entry retro-dated from 1 January 1917 for the 1917 New Year Honours.

In 1918, Reddie presided over many sessions of the Worcester Sub-Committee of the Disabled Soldiers and Sailors, especially getting veterans of the war trained in basket weaving, market Gardening, agriculture, and carpet weaving for new career prospects. By 1920, Reddie was a stout advocate for veterans pensions, and complained that June that the Birmingham Regional Authority was consistently delaying its pension payouts for veterans of the war. Later known as the War Disabled Help Department, Reddie passed this command on to Christopher Garrett Elkington.

By 1931, Reddie was the chairman of the executive of the Worcestershire Playing Fields Association, the Worcestershire branch of the National Playing Fields Association, where he formally opened the village playing field at Hallow Park.

At the 1943 New Year Honours, Reddie was awarded a Knighthood.

In 1947, Reddie retired from the Worcestershire Regiment's Old Comrades Association (W.R.O.C.A.), passing on the command to Charles Pearce Germon Wills.

== Dates of rank ==
Rank	Date	Unit	Ref.
Second lieutenant	17 December 1892	Worcestershire Regiment	
Lieutenant	23 May 1896	Worcestershire Regiment	
Captain	19 January 1897	3rd Battalion, Worcestershire Regiment	
Commandant	8 February 1897	British North Borneo Constabulary	
Adjutant	14 February 1900	3rd Battalion, Worcestershire Regiment	
Major	11 April 1908	Worcestershire Regiment	
Lieutenant Colonel			
Colonel			
Deputy lieutenant	17 April 1916	Worcestershire	
