= Kudat Raid =

1900 rebellion against Company rule in North Borneo

- Part of the Mat Salleh Rebellion
Date	April 1900 – May 1900
Location	Kudat, British North Borneo

Belligerents
Rebels	North Borneo Chartered Company

Commanders and leaders
Mat Sator ☠; Latip ☠; Langkap; Mat Daud; Talip; Kamunta	Governor Hugh Clifford; E. H. Barraut; G. H. Malcolm; Charles Herbert Harington; Daim

Units involved
Rebel units	British North Borneo Constabulary

Casualties and losses
12 dead, 3 hanged, 33 arrested	Unknown

The Kudat Raid was a battle of the Mat Salleh Rebellion in 1900, after the death of Mat Salleh, between the forces of Mat Sator (or Jator) and the British North Borneo Constabulary, the military and police force of British North Borneo under the rule of the North Borneo Chartered Company.

== History ==
=== Background ===
Mat Sator was not killed when his burning fort came crashing down around him during the fighting at Tambunan, and he crawled out of the rubble some time later to discover that Salleh's own fort was destroyed and Mat Salleh was dead, having taken a bullet to the head. He connected and regrouped with Langkap, Mat Daud, Talip, and Kamunta to continue their rebellion against the North Borneo Chartered Company and Company rule. They decided to attack Kudat, which would then serve as a beachhead against Sandakan. Kudat was the largest Company settlement on the coast between Sandakan and Labuan, with 30 Sikh members of the Constabulary garrisoned there under the District Officer, G. H. Malcolm.

On 27 April 1900, the clerk of Kota Belud, Arsat, gave a warning to Resident E. H. Barraut that Mat Sator was planning to attack Kudat within 24 hours. That evening, a Dusun chief named Bladau confirmed this warning. Between 300 and 400 Bajau, Illanun and Dusun warriors were now on the war path, heading straight to the town of Kudat.

The rebels were not aware of the fact that a ship carrying an extra 40 Constabulary members was docked in the harbor that night, ready to ferry the troops to Sandakan the next morning.

=== Battle of Kudat ===
Two rebel scouts were captured by the Constabulary in the early hours of 28 April. G. H. Malcolm, the District Officer, ordered his forces to concentrate on the Treasury building.

The watchword, "friend," had not been changed in months, and the rebels had learned it through intelligence. They spoke the watchword to the Sikh constable guarding the entrance to the underground magazine at the town's gaol. He let them pass, at which point one of the rebels killed him with a bladed weapon. The Sergeant of the Guard, Futta Singh, was also killed. At this point, having heard a commotion, the five remaining gaol guards opened fire, shooting blindly into the darkness while retreating to the Treasury. The magazine then fell into the control of the rebels, who were now in possession of new rifles and ammunition. They did not, however, have the ability to load and fire the maxim gun without hassle, and left it in the magazine. The rebels were in control of Kudat for roughly an hour, and began firing at the Treasury.

A Dutch man staying at the hotel was awoken by a stray bullet smashing into the wall of his hotel room. He shouted that the Constabulary needed more target practice, and then he went back to sleep.

The Dyak contingent sleeping aboard the ship in harbor had heard the gunfire and began unloading onto the docks. They formed ranks and began firing at the raiders.

Shortly after 4am, Malcolm took a party of 20 Sikh members of the Constabulary to counterattack the magazine.

Daim, the Prison Overseer, ran down the stairs of the magazine with a spear in his hand. He stabbed one man straight through the heart. Another man leapt from the window to attack Daim, but a member of the Constabulary shot him. Daim, after killing about twelve men with his spear, then proceeded to chop of the heads of Mat Sator and Latip. He hurled their heads up the steps of the magazine.

The remaining rebels then fled into the jungle. Three prisoners were captured by the Constabulary, who were later hanged.

=== Ludah and surrounding villages ===
On 20 May 1900, Governor Clifford marched with the Constabulary and Commandant Captain C. H. Harington to Kudat. They discovered that the remaining rebels were hiding-out in Illanun coast villages at the southwest end of the Kudat Peninsula.

Harington's Constabulary force was then loaded onto the HMS Labuan, accompanied by Barraut and Malcolm. They landed near Pindassan, and began an overnight march inland. At dawn, they surrounded the village of Ludah and captured the residents by surprise.

The headman of Ludah surrendered without a fight and provided the names of those involved in the raid at Kudat. His own son had also been involved. With this information, the Constabulary marched on other nearby villages and arrested those rebel leaders.

=== Aftermath ===
Dusun villages near Kudat surrendered to the Company in Planting of the Stone ceremonies. Those stones were kept untouched for many years at the Kudat Golf Course, which was constructed around them.

The leaders Langkap and Kamunta, however, remained at-large.
