= Sigunting War =

Rebellion against British rule in North Borneo (1894–1901)

Date	1894–1901
Location	British North Borneo
Result	British victory; treaty of recognition arranged

Belligerents
Mumus Rebels	North Borneo Chartered Company

Commanders and leaders
Datoh Undok; Sigunting; Simbarrang; Togallen; Tampuhim	Datoh Undok; Edward Algernon Barnett; Alexander Rankin Dunlop; W. H. Hastings; George Ormsby; William Raffles Flint

Units involved
Sigunting Rebels	British North Borneo Constabulary

Casualties and losses
Killed 14 (+)	Killed 12 (+); Wounded 18

The Sigunting War (or Sogunting War, the Gunting War or Gunting Rebellion), was a seven-year rebellion by the Dusun people against the British-led colonial rule of the North Borneo Chartered Company in British North Borneo. The rebellion was mostly led by the Dunsun warrior, Sigunting. The first British expeditions against Sigunting in 1894 against the towns of Mumus and Saiap, were known as the Mumus Saiap Expedition.

By the end of the war, Sigunting held an almost-mythical status and served as an inspiration for many; they believed he could walk on water, his skin was impenetrable to swords and bullets, and he could fly in the trees. His rebellion inspired many other smaller indigenous uprisings throughout North Borneo, including the Kwijau Rebellion and the Mat Salleh Rebellion. Today, the Gunting War remains an inspiration for the Idaʼan, Kadazan, and Kadazan-Dusun indigenous liberation movements.

== Background ==
=== Village disagreements over taxes ===
The British North Borneo Company (BNBC), after establishing the jurisdiction of North Borneo in 1881, levied new taxes in the colony over items that had been untaxed before their arrival. At the heart of significant local unrest was the head tax that was imposed on the Dusun peoples, and the tax on coconuts and on coconut products.

=== Argument over dowry ===
An altercation occurred between a Dusun man – most likely of the Rungus people or the Liwan tribe – named Si Gunting (or Sigunting), and a clerk of the BNBC. The altercation arose when the clerk, who had asked for the hand of a local Rungus woman in marriage, had refused to pay a dowry to the woman's family. Sigunting lodged a formal complaint with the head chief of the coast, Datoh Undok, who had been appointed by the BNBC to handle local affairs. The Resident received an official report from Datoh Undok, which declared that Sigunting was a criminal. Datoh, however, also informed Sigunting that the British would take no part in what was considered a "local matter," and that "he should know how to deal with a matter like that."

According to several sources, Datoh Undok lied to both parties: Sigunting was not a criminal, and the British had made no such indication to Datoh. Years after these events occurred, an investigation indicated that Datoh had planned to use this event as a catalyst for a revolution.

== Engagements ==
With Sigunting under the impression that the British had no plans on reprimanding their clerk, he became enraged at their cultural insensitivity. Marching down to the local police station, he led a raiding party that ambushed the clerk and seven policemen, killing them. The Resident of the West Coast, R. M. Little, barely escaped.

=== Battle of Mumus ===
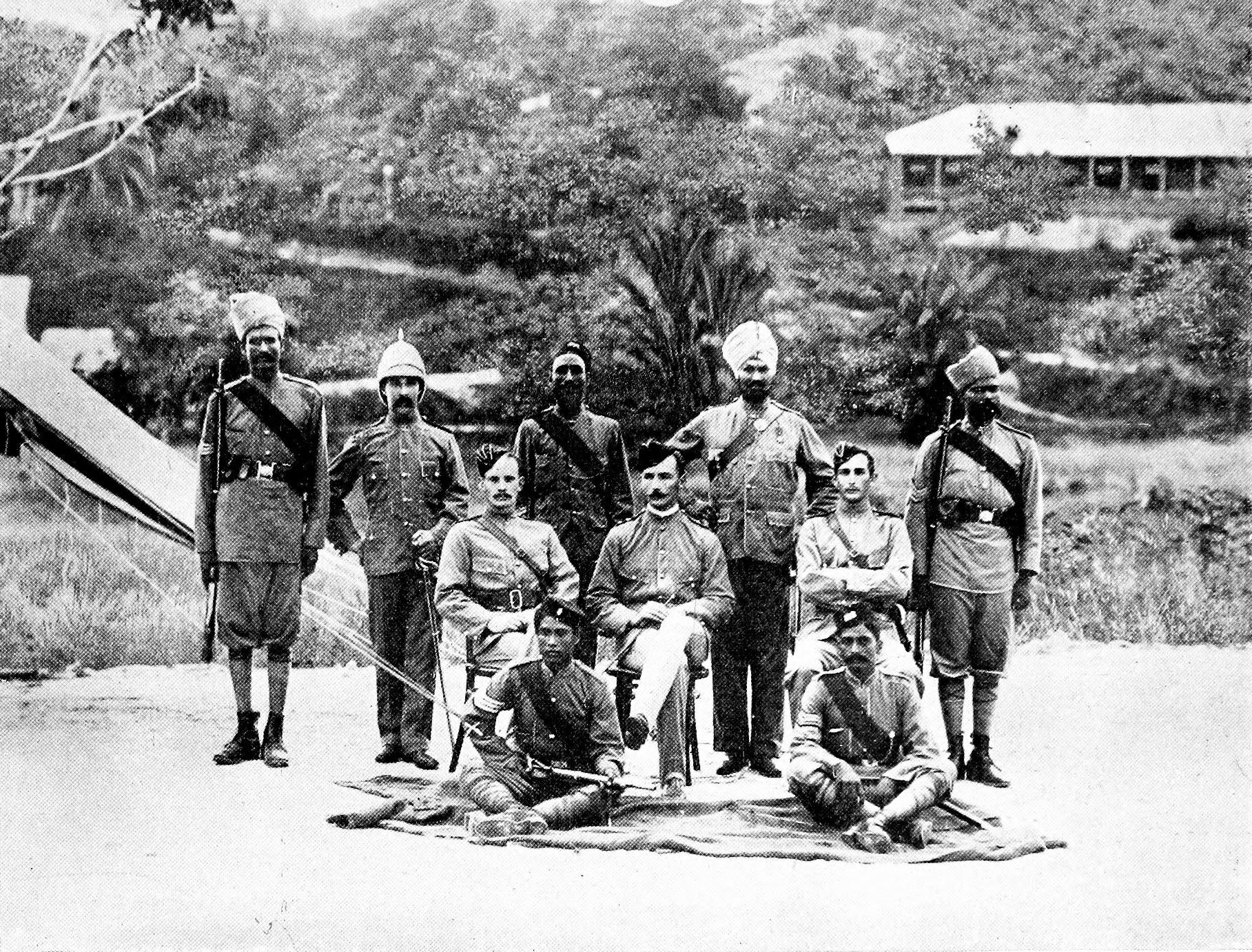
The British North Borneo Constabulary served a dual function as the military and police force of British North Borneo.

In May 1894, Commandant Barnett organised an expedition of the British North Borneo Constabulary to pursue Sigunting. First, they marched on his village of Mumus in the Marudu hills, near Kota Marudu and Marudu Bay – formerly an area of the Kingdom of Marudu. While they successfully subdued the village, Si Gunting retreated, leaving his wife behind, who was treated for malaria by W. H. Hastings and Commandant Barnett. Gunting regrouped in the town of Saiap, Tempasuk, near present-day Kota Belud District.

=== Battle of Saiap ===
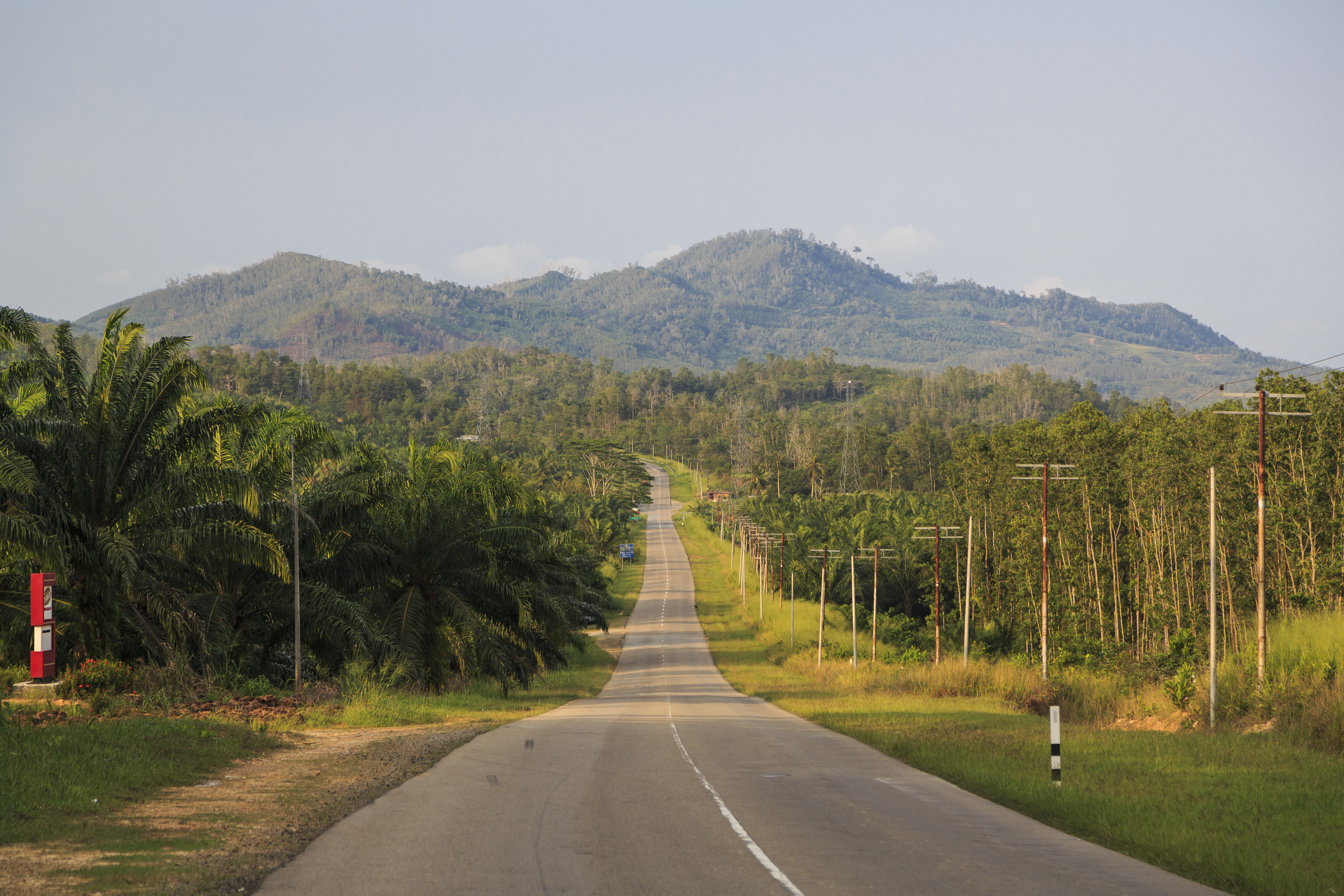
Today, Kudat District is part of the Malaysian state of Sabah

When the Constabulary received information on Gunting's location, they marched on Saiap. The advanced party of 30 NCOs and their men was led by A. R. Dunlop. The primary contingent of over 50 NCOs and their men was led by Commandant Barnett, W. H. Hastings and G. Ormsby. They had difficulty marching over the terrain; Sigunting's men had boobytrapped the trail with traps of sharpened bamboo sticks called sudah (literally meaning finished), something similar to runcing traps or punji sticks.

At 8am, 2 June 1894, the Constabulary encountered an earthwork fortification on a hill overlooking the Wariu River. They assaulted the position, and the Sigunting Rebels retreated. At 11am, following the Wairu to a junction with a tributary, the Constabulary could hear gongs and drums being beaten. Some of Sigunting's men were occupying a fort the hills overlooking the junction. Dunlop took his men to occupy a hill inside the fort, but a few squads of the main column misunderstood the order to halt and rushed the fort, and they were forced to retreat after Sigunting's men fired on them. W. H. Hastings attempted to take the hill, but many of his men were injured by sudah, incapacitating the squad. The Sigunting Rebels defended themselves well here, assisted by their defensive traps and fortified position. They fired at the British and were able to repel them several times.

Dunlop was forced to retreat after several casualties, including one major fatality. Commandant Barnett rushed forward with the main column. After saving the life of one of his Sikh members, he was shot in the head, but survived after immediate traditional medicine was administered by his local guide. When he was fully recovered, he ordered the group to take the hill "at all costs." The final push took ten minutes. The Sigunting Rebels suffered seven deaths here before abandoning the position. After the Sigunting Rebels retreated toward Saiap, Dunlop and Ormsby marched with 50 men to eliminate them and occupy the village of Saiap. The rest of the expeditionary force quartered in the village that evening, but Sigunting had escaped.

=== Further battles ===
The BNBC became extremely worried in 1896 when Mat Salleh began the Mat Salleh Rebellion, inspired by Sigunting, that the two men would join forces. An expedition was launched to stop the two men from doing that. That effort largely succeeded – the BNBC were engaged in two wars of rebellion simultaneously; fighting Mat Salleh in one part of the island and searching for Sigunting in another. The Sigunting War lasted for over another six years until 1901, when Sigunting surrendered.

== Aftermath ==
In 1902, Sigunting joined forces with the other great Kadazan leaders Kamanta and Lengap in an uprising at Ambong. Both Kamanta and Lengap were killed during the Tenom Expedition. Sigunting survived.

In 1905, Sigunting surrendered to Captain A. B. C. Francis, the pseudonym of Charles Bruce. In Bruce's memoirs, Twenty Years in Borneo, he writes that Sigunting – whom he calls Gunting – was a dear friend, even while Bruce was leading a Constabulary expedition to capture him.

The official surrender involved the Planting of the Stone, and the sacrificial slaughtering of a buffalo.

Sigunting died some time later in 1905. He is buried in Serinism Park, Kinabalu Park, next to the giant of legend, Gambaliu.
