= Edward Algernon Barnett =

British colonial soldier (1856–1955)

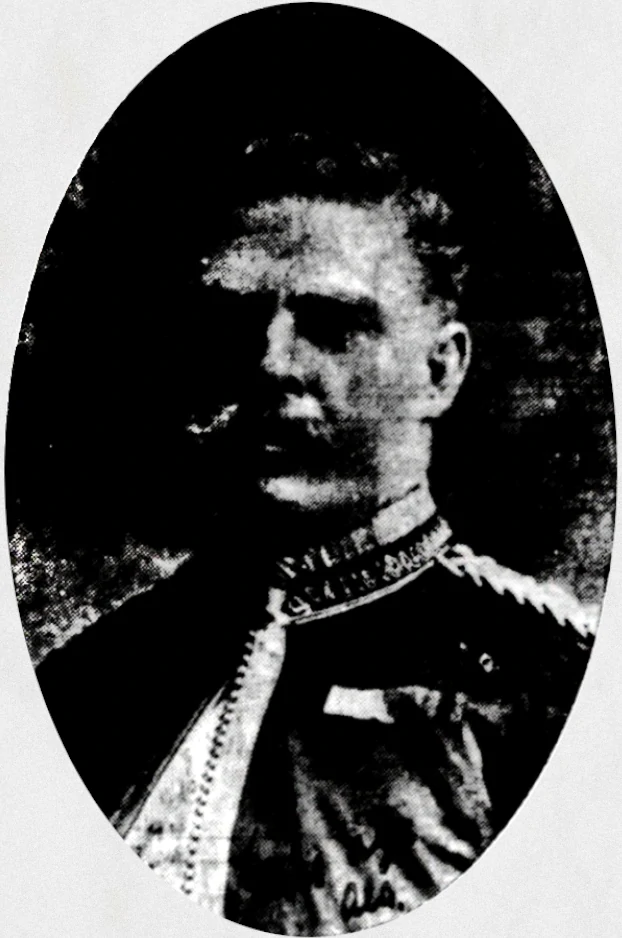

5th Commandant of the British North Borneo Constabulary
- In office August 1889 – November 1896
- Preceded by: Robert Dudley Beeston
- Succeeded by: John Murray Reddie

Personal details
- Born: 6 March 1856 Chigwell, Essex, England, United Kingdom
- Died: 13 October 1955 (aged 99) Sunbury-on-Thames
- Spouse: Clara Louisa Leader (m. 1888; div. 1896)
- Parents: Jaquetta Wright Sanders; Edward Barnett GM
- Education: Burney's Academy

Military service
- Branch/service: (United Kingdom) Middlesex Militia; (Cape Colony) Frontier Armed and Mounted Police; (Cape Colony) Cape Mounted Riflemen; Hausa Armed Constabulary; British North Borneo Constabulary; (United Kingdom) East Surrey Regiment
- Rank: Major
- Battles/wars: Xhosa Wars; Gaika-Galeka War; South African Wars; Basuto Gun War; Anglo-Ashanti Wars; Sigunting War; Kwijau Rebellion; Mat Salleh Rebellion; World War I

Edward Algernon Barnett was a British military and police officer who served in high-ranking positions throughout the British Empire, including the Gold Coast and North Borneo. He lived to 99 years of age, just shy of a full century, and during his later years he was known as "Red Pepper," because he had a "fiery disposition." He was also a cofounder of the Empire Lodge, No. 2108, of the United Grand Lodge of England.

== Biography ==
E. Algernon Barnett was born in Chigwell, Essex in 1856. He attended the preparatory Royal Naval Academy, Gosport. After this, he attended the Realschule in Lippstadt. He was gazetted into the Fourth Royal Middlesex Militia in 1875.

At 21 years old, he travelled to the Cape Colony, where he enlisted in the Frontier Armed and Mounted Police (FAMP). He rose to the rank of Sergeant, and retained the rank when the FAMP was re-badged as the Cape Mounted Riflemen. While he was in the Cape Colony, he fought in the Gaika-Galeka War and the Basuto Gun War.

He was offered a commission in the Cape Colony but declined it, traveling instead to the Gold Coast to join the Hausa Armed Constabulary. Here, he held many high-ranking positions, including the post of commissioner, and sheriff of several districts.

In April 1888, he negotiated the ascension to the crown of King Prempeh I at Kumasi. In this, he was one of the few outsiders to have ever witnessed the crowning of an Ashanti King.

After 7 years of service in the Gold Coast, Barnett was recruited into the service of the North Borneo Chartered Company as one of the first recruits into the government of their newly established country of North Borneo.

He landed in North Borneo on 7 April 1889.

Serving as the Commandant of the British North Borneo Constabulary, Barnett led North Borneo's expeditions against a rebel warrior named Si Gunting during the Sigunting War. During the Sigunting War, Barnett was shot in the head, but he survived. He also led the Constabulary during the Kwijau Rebellion and the earliest stages of the Mat Salleh Rebellion.

In 1883, he was made a non-resident fellow of the Royal Colonial Institute.

In 1907, Barnett returned to the Gold Coast as an oil spectator and established the company "Captain Edward Algernon Barnett and Rosewarne (Limited)." He was involved in a scandal by selling an oil concession that technically hadn't been granted to him, disrupting the Colonial Office and Nigeria Bitumen in the process.

During the First World War from 1915 to 1919, he served as a Major in the Royal Berkshire Regiment.
