= Mat Salleh Rebellion =

1894–1905 armed disturbances in North Borneo

Date	1894–1905
Location	North Borneo (present-day Sabah)
Result	Rebellion suppressed

Belligerents
Rebels	North Borneo Chartered Company

Commanders and leaders
Datu Muhammad Salleh (KIA); Mat Sator (KIA); Lingkong; Mat Daud; Timus; Sarah; Santara; Langkap; Kamunta	Charles Vandeleur Creagh; Leicester Paul Beaufort; Edward Algernon Barnett; John Murray Reddie; Charles Herbert Harington; Henry Stanley Bond; William Raffles Flint; Claude Dansey; Alexander Rankin Dunlop

Units involved
Rebel units	British North Borneo Constabulary

The Mat Salleh Rebellion was a series of major armed disturbances against the British North Borneo Chartered Company administration in North Borneo, now the Malaysian state of Sabah. It was instigated by Datu Muhammad Salleh (also known as Mat Salleh), a local chief from the Lingkabo district and Sugut River. He led the rebellion between 1894 until his death in Tambunan in 1900. The rebellion then continued on for another five years until 1905. (Note: Sources conflict about the end date of the rebellion. Some state 1903, others 1905.)

His revolts were widely supported by the local communities and affected a large geographical area from Sandakan, across Gaya Island, including the interior, especially Tambunan. His most notable uprising occurred at midnight on 9 July 1897, when he led his followers to successfully attack a major colonial settlement on Gaya Island.

== Biography of Mat Salleh ==
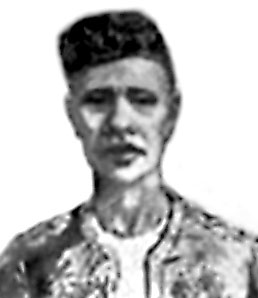
Datu Mat Salleh

Mat Salleh was born in Inanam, Jesselton (present-day Kota Kinabalu). His father was Datu Balu, a traditional leader in Inanam and a Suluk or Tausug. His mother was of Bajau descent. He had three siblings: Ali, Badin and Bolong. The family moved to Sugut, which unlike Inanam, was in the North Borneo Chartered Company's concession but since the abandonment of its tobacco estates, it had reportedly been "left largely to its own devices", and enjoyed relative autonomy. There, Datu Bulu assumed a local leadership position along part of the Sugut River on the eastern coast of North Borneo.

Later in his life, Mat Salleh married a Sulu princess named Dayang Bandang. She was related to the Sultan of Sulu's family and her village was at Penggalaban, Paitan. He later inherited his father's local leadership position as the village chieftain in the Lingkabau district and Sungei Sugut.

Mat Salleh was often physically described as slender and tall, with pockmarked features. He was also well known as a mysterious (Note: Some of his supporters believed he possessed supernatural powers that made him invulnerable to physical harm and the inability to be hurt or killed by conventional weapons (typically known as Kebal in the Malay language). Even, invisibility so as not to be seen by his enemies. For many, his ability to repeatedly evade the Company's attacks served as proof of these claims.) and intelligent man, with a commanding personality and presence. He was well-respected and his great tactical skills were renowned among the local communities.

== Salleh's supporters ==
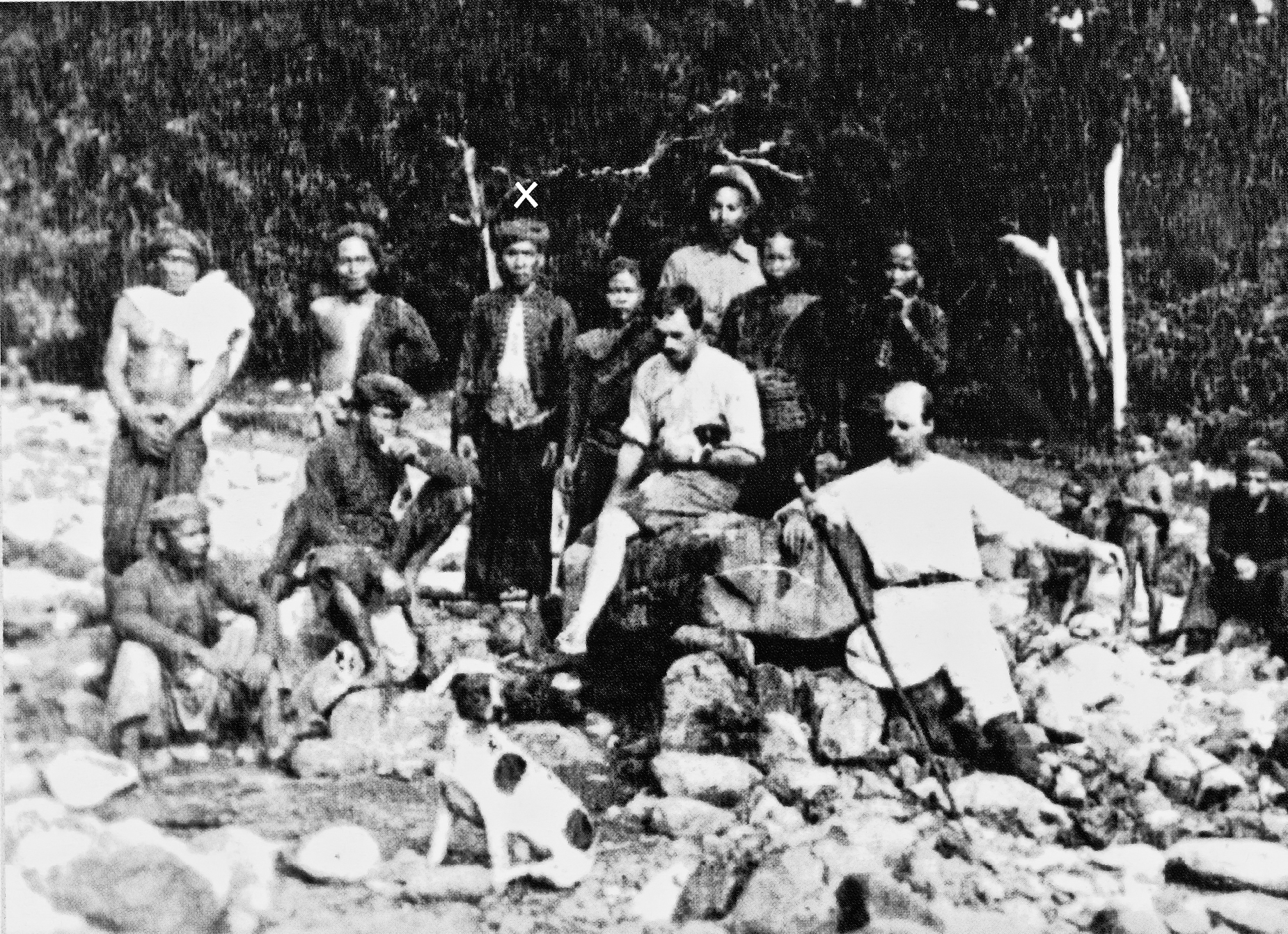
This is, apparently, the only known available photograph of Mat Salleh (marked with a white "X").

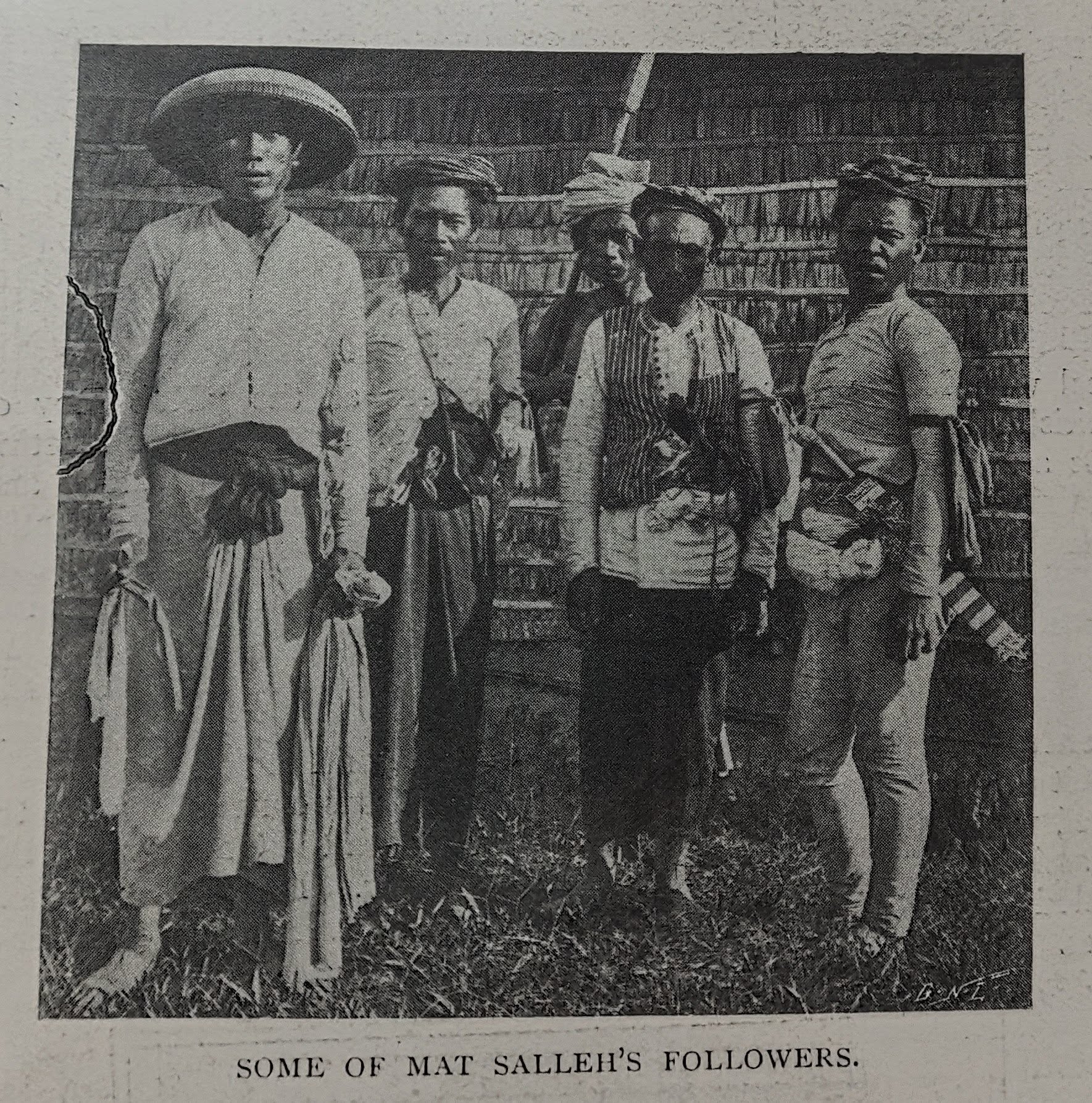
A picture of Mat Salleh's followers.

His mixed parentage and role as a traditional local leader which he had inherited from his father contributed to his significant Bajau and Suluk following. Also, his marriage to Dayang Bandang, who was related to the ruling family in Sulu helped him win more supporters.

However, his wide support not only came from his family affiliations and connections. He was also able to garner supporters from Dusun communities spread over a sizeable area in North Borneo and had the Tagahas communities as allies, among others. He was skilled at connecting with and uniting other communities, making him a great personage among the multi-ethnic indigenous people. For example, some accounts claim that he used and married various symbols of authority and mysticism that the different communities could relate with to attest to his leadership position and military prowess. (Note: Some symbols that he used were enormous silk umbrellas (high society), insignia of royalty, and even inscriptions that were apparently believed to make him invincible.)

The large areas where his support came from proved instrumental in ensuring the initial success of his revolt as these areas were available to provide power bases, supplies and construction of forts. This also implied that he and his army had ample mobility between forts and bases, which explains their repeated evasion of the company's troops. From 1895 to 1897, he had at his disposal at least six forts which were well-prepared with resources and manpower that he could mobilise at short notice.

The forts that his followers built were reportedly well designed and constructed.

"most extraordinary place and without the guns [the company's seven pounders] would have been absolutely impregnable. The buildings covered three sides of a square, the fourth side being closed by a stone wall. The whole square was 22 yards by 20 and the fact that over 200 shell burst inside will give some idea of its strength, the enemy still remaining in possession. The walls of the building were of stone, 8 feet thick with numerous large bamboos built into them for loopholes. The whole fort was surrounded with three bamboo fences... and the ground between was simply covered with 'sudah' (bamboo spikes)... on the inside of the square the loopholes were also very cunningly arranged to repel internal attack. There was neither exit nor entrance to the buildings and had an attacking force, no matter how strong, succeeded in reaching the middle of the square they would have been no nearer capturing the place than if they had stayed away, and they would have been shot down ... without the possibility of returning fire."

== North Borneo Chartered Company ==
=== Changes imposed ===
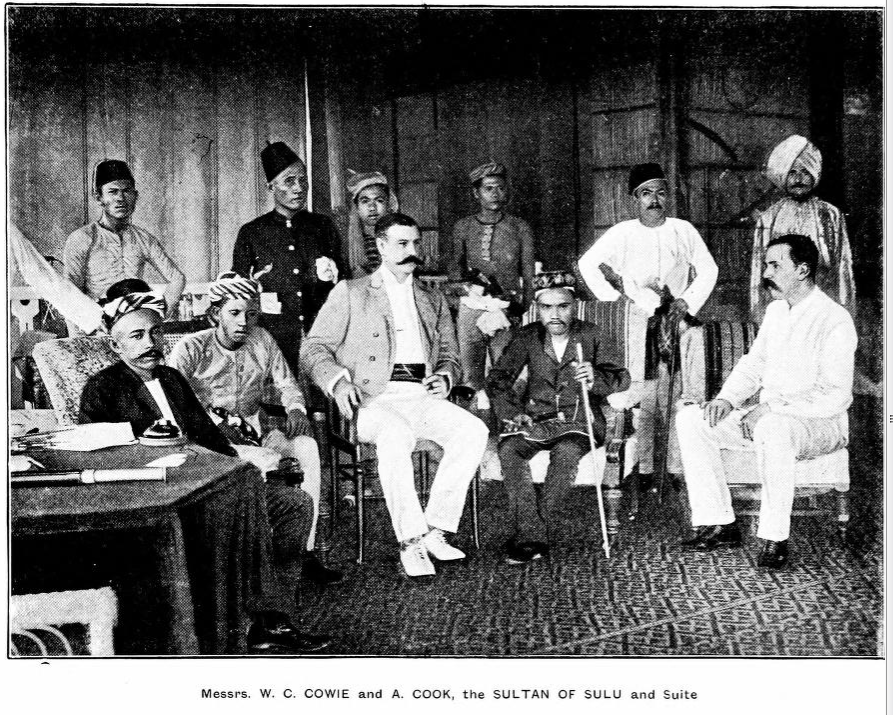
W. C. Cowie, managing director with the Sultan of Sulu

Before the arrival of the British North Borneo Chartered Company, central authority in North Borneo was weak. Part of it was governed by Brunei and part by Sulu. This gave local chiefs and traditional elites relative autonomy to practice influence and power to regulate trade in the area and serve the responsibility of protecting the local inhabitants from excessive exploitation by foreign traders.

The British arrived during the late 19th century, and their administration (under the London-based North Borneo Chartered Company) in North Borneo lasted sixty years, between 1881 and 1941. It aimed to transform North Borneo into a producer of various agricultural products, predominantly tobacco. Apart from the introduction of cash-crop farming, the company also imposed new taxation laws and set up administrative centres. Some of the changes brought about by them were:

- Introduction of new taxes, including a levy on rice, the staple food of the population.
- Poll-tax and passes for boats on local communities, including members of the local elites and traditional leaders.
- Mandatory licenses for local boat owners.
- Passed a Village Ordinance, resulting in the company not sanctioning the authority and traditional social position of a large number of traditional elites and local chiefs. This consequently alienated them and undermined their roles and social statuses.
- A customs station was built on Jambongan Island, staffed by a non-European clerk and policeman.
- A new police station was established on the Kinarom.

In its attempt to revitalise the sagging economy, then managing director of the North Borneo Chartered Company, William C. Cowie also launched two major projects:

- The construction of a cross-country rail between Brunei Bay and Cowie Harbour
- A telegraphic line from Labuan to Sandakan

New levies were imposed to finance these large-scale projects. Lack of manpower, however, caused the company to rely on local chieftains as agents for revenue collection. Among those who cooperated with the company, some abused their authority and overtaxed the natives, exacerbating dissatisfaction among local people already burdened by other new laws imposed by the company. Mat Salleh viewed the company's new rules as an infringement of native rights, refused to acknowledge the company's authority, and continued to collect taxes from traders traveling via the Sugut River as he had before the rules were imposed, without turning them over to the company. Numerous other local chiefs shared Mat Salleh's opinions on the company's new rules. Many of them later joined his cause.

=== Administrative centre relocated from Gaya Island to the mainland ===
The company had set up its initial administrative centres on the west coast of North Borneo in Papar and Tempassuk. In between these areas was the Gaya station, (Note: Gaya Island (along with other locations in the west coast of Sabah) was acquired by the British through an agreement with the Sultan of Brunei, Sultan Abdul Mumin Ebn Marhoum Maulana Abdul Wahab on 29 December 1877.) set up in September 1882 as a collection station for jungle and local produce. This station also served as a "stopping place" for European officials plying between Kudat and Labuan. Gaya Island was initially thought of as a highly prospective settlement site and a possible port of call. It however, did not flourish as expected; trade, collection of local produce and other economic activities did not prosper. After the station in Gaya was raided and torched by Mat Salleh and his followers in July 1897, (Note: Some British colonial sources claim that the abandonment of Gaya was not entirely caused by Mat Salleh. After the raid, the Company attempted to rebuild the township. However, it failed to economically flourish. Also, the company's railway project (above-mentioned under changes imposed after the arrival of the British North Borneo Chartered Company's arrival) that were started in 1896 had reached a stage where a suitable exit point was needed at the end of the line from Beaufort and Weston. As Gaya is an island, it had to be ruled out, and a new site had to be found on the mainland. With the acquisition of new territories from Brunei. There were also many new and more suitable sites to choose from.) the British relocated to the mainland, in Gantian.

== Mat Salleh uprisings, 1895–1905 ==
At any rate, you will admit that your company cannot prevent us from dying for what we think are our rights.

— Mat Salleh, to William C. Cowie, the managing director of the British North Borneo Company who had come from London on a special mission to arrange peace talks with him in 1898

=== 1894 ===
Mat Salleh first came to the company's attention when he was suspected of involvement in the murder and robbery of two Iban traders on the Sugut River in 1894. Captain Barnett and a few other colonial officials were sent to Mat Salleh's residence to investigate the matter. (Note: Some sources claim that Captain Barnett and his men were sent to confront, accuse and detain him. During this confrontation, Captain Barnett had attempted to forcefully apprehend Mat Salleh, but was outnumbered by his followers, ready to take up arms to protect him.) Mat Salleh denied his and his followers' involvement in it and resisted arrest. This incident marked the first of many misunderstandings, creating a tense and hostile situation between both parties.

=== Sandakan incident (1895) ===
In August 1895, in an attempt to have their grievances addressed through the colonial institution, Mat Salleh, his followers and traditional chiefs from Sugut went to Sandakan, then the seat of the government of North Borneo, to present a petition against the collection of poll-tax and the imposition of passes on boats by government chiefs to governor L. P. Beaufort and his representatives. (Note: There are two versions of this incident: 1. Mat Salleh came peacefully and apart from presenting his petition, meant to clear his name and settle the misunderstanding regarding his involvement in the Iban murders. Instead, he was treated with hostility by then present treasurer-in-general Alexander Cook, who then turned him away, causing much embarrassment to Mat Salleh.; 2. Mat Salleh arrived with an armed entourage of boats to present their petitions detailing their grievances towards the company. In the absence of Governor Leicester P. Beaufort, Cook, petrified by the show of force, requested through a representative that Mat Salleh and the others tender their petition in a formal manner and instructed them to disperse. There was a delay in relating this message and Cook's request only reached Mat Salleh after he had waited for two days.) However, L. P. Beaufort and his representatives were away on another expedition. Treasurer-in-general Alexander Cook, who was aware of their visit instead denied them an audience. After two days of waiting, Mat Salleh and his party left.

Following this, a complaint against Mat Salleh and his party was forwarded to the governor and other colonial officials by Cook. In response, on 29 August 1895, representatives from the company arrived at Mat Salleh's home in Jambongan to arrest him and four of his followers on the grounds of disturbing the peace at Sandakan and involvement with the murders of the two Ibans in 1894. Mat Salleh refused to comply and escaped. This led to his house and village being attacked, burned and looted. The company then declared him a wanted man. A reward of 500 Straits dollar (Note: Other accounts state that the reward was Straits $700.) was offered for his capture.

This incident triggered him to wage war against the North Borneo Chartered Company. He then consolidated his position at Lingkabau, approximately 80 kilometres (50 miles) up the Sugut River and with strong support from the native Dusun community there, built a strong fort. The British subsequently attacked it but failed to capture him. Instead, they destroyed it and captured about 60 Dusun as prisoners of war.

After this, he re-established himself in Labuk and built his headquarters at Limbawan. He had received support from the Labuk people as well. In September 1896, the British made another attack, surrounding Limbawan and cutting off possible escape routes. Again, they failed to apprehend him, although they managed to capture and demolish the fort. Following their escape, Mat Salleh and his followers built another fort at Padang at Ulu Sugut.

=== 1897 (Gaya attack) ===
At midnight on 9 July 1897, Mat Salleh successfully led his followers to attack the company's settlement on Gaya Island. They raided and torched the Gaya compound before escaping with loot estimated to be worth 100,000 Straits dollars. They also took the treasury clerk F. S. Neubronner, hostage. The success of this attack increased his reputation as a local hero. This helped to further widen his reach, influence and support. After this attack, the company's managing director, Cowie and the governor, L. P. Beaufort, visited the Sultan of Brunei seeking compensation, claiming that some of the attackers were from regions under his jurisdiction. These areas were also claimed to have had been used as bases by Mat Salleh. The negotiations brought the Mengkabong, Manggatal and Api-Api districts (opposite Gaya Island) under the company's administration.

After the successful attack on Gaya Island, Mat Salleh and his followers moved on to a fort on the Soan on the Labuk, then Parachangan on the Sugut, then proceeded to attack and burn down the government residency at Ambong in November 1897.

Following this, he established his next fort at Ranau. On 13 December 1897, the company attacked this fort. They were defeated and lost about 10 men, including an Officer Jones, who had led the attack. On 9 January 1898, they attacked the fort for a second time with a larger force and captured it. However, by then, Mat Salleh and his men had already abandoned the fort and established a new one in the interior of Tambunan.

The Tambunan fort was stronger and more stable than his previous fort. It was reported to have been:

...very difficult to attack as the fort was built from stones, wood and bamboo which prevented the bullets from penetrating the walls of the fort. Each corner of the fort was guarded and there were many secret tunnels for them to seek assistance for firearms and food from outside the fort. These secret tunnels were also used for retreat when they were surrounded by the enemies

This was also the last fort he used for defence during the rebellion.

=== 1898 (Palatan Peace Pact) ===
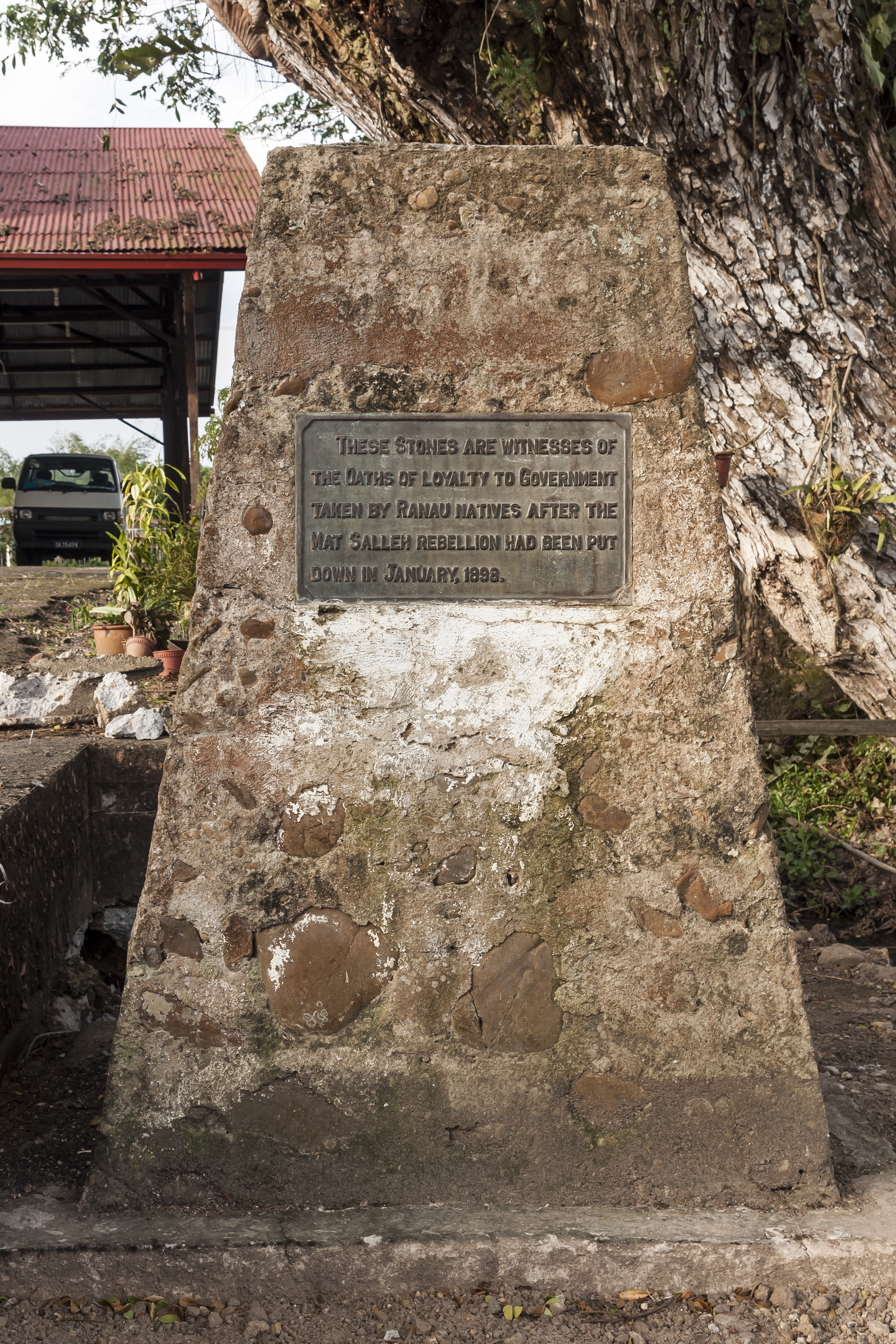
Oath Stone erected by the Company in January 1898 "as witness of the oaths of loyalty" taken by Mat Salleh, his followers and other Ranau natives after a peace pact was agreed on

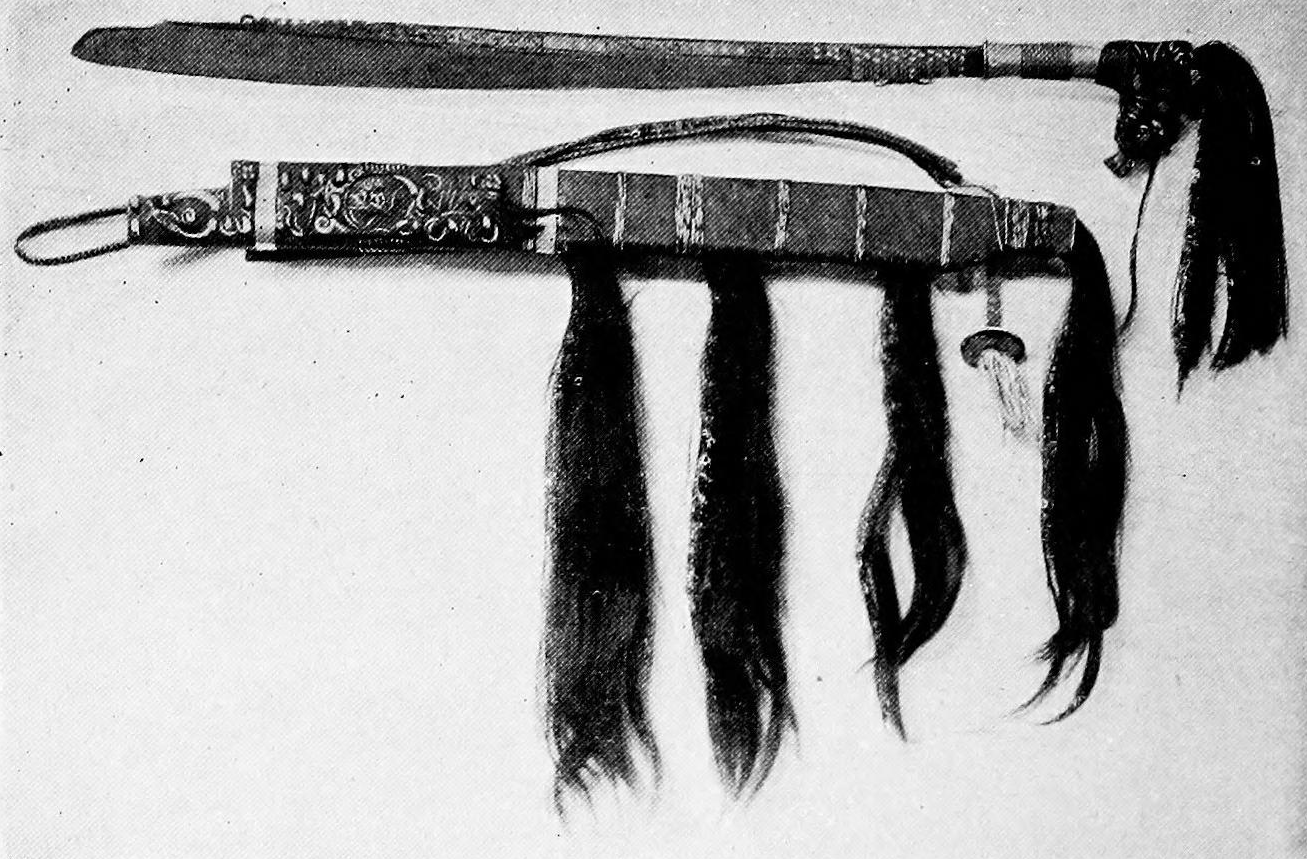
Mat Salleh's mandau, which he had surrendered to Cowie as a symbolic act of his acknowledgement of the North Borneo Chartered Company's authority after the peace agreements. In some accounts, Cowie had then "graciously" returned it to Mat Salleh as a gesture of their friendly terms.

The tit-for-tat dual reached deadlock by early 1898. Cowie, managing director to the court of directors of the North Borneo Chartered Company, travelled from London to arrange peace talks and a peace pact with Mat Salleh (the Palatan Peace Pact). Simultaneously, the Sultan of Sulu wrote a letter to Dayang Bandung, Mat Salleh's wife, urging a peace settlement with Cowie.

The meeting occurred at Kampung Palatan in Ulu Menggatal on 19 April 1898. Mat Salleh was offered a pardon if resistance ceased. Cowie verbally promised amnesty and to allow Mat Salleh to settle in the Tambunan Valley, pledging noninterference from the government. Mat Salleh acceded and offered to accept it on two conditions:

- The release of his imprisoned men; and,
- That he be allowed to stay at Inanam.

Cowie refused these conditions, permitting Mat Salleh only to stay in Tambunan or parts of the interior excluding Sugut and Lambuk, his former strongholds. In addition, Cowie made an additional promise that if Mat Sallah kept his peace for twelve consecutive months and cooperated with the Company, Cowie would recommend Mat Sallah to the court of directors for an appointment as chief or headman of a district.

On 20 April 1898, Cowie, governor L. P. Beaufort and two officers (P. Wise and A. Terms) met with Mat Salleh again and this time, he was allowed "to live in the interior and take charge of the Tambunan district". With this, a ceremony was held to mark Mat Salleh's official possession of the Menggatal River on 22 April 1898. The next day, on 23 April 1898, the Company sent an official document to Mat Salleh to sign. The document stated that:

- Mat Salleh and his men were to be pardoned except those remaining in prison and those who had previously escaped;
- Mat Salleh could stay in Tambunan or elsewhere within the interior except the Sugut and Labuk rivers;
- That he was to report to the district officer on occasions he visited the coast (Note: In some accounts, there was a discrepancy between the verbal and written agreement. Only when the written agreement was sent did Mat Salleh realise that he had been denied the pardon of his men who were escaped felons. Mat Salleh felt deceived and began to secretly strengthen his position in Tambunan.)

=== 1899 ===
Mat Salleh and his allies were at war with the Taiwan communities. The latter approached the company with urgent appeals for its intervention. This led Beaufort to visit the Taiwan villages on 15 January 1899 and obtain an oath of allegiance from them. This was also, apparently, a strategic move by the company (Note: In the process of building a telegraph line, two new stations were established in the interior: one at Sapong in 1895 and another at Keningau in 1896, each under the European officer. The appointment of F W. Fraser at district offices at Keningau in 1898 signalled the extension of company rule to Tambunan.) to pursue its plans to establish an administrative centre in Tambunan.

Seeing this as a breach of faith to their earlier agreement, Mat Salleh prepared to resume resistance against the company. In December 1899, R. M. Little, the Resident of Labuan, was instructed to initiate negotiations. Mat Salleh refused negotiations and demanded their withdrawal from Tambunan which they refused. Almost immediately after this, Mat Salleh and his followers resumed waging sporadic attacks.

=== 1900–1905 (Mat Salleh's defeat) ===
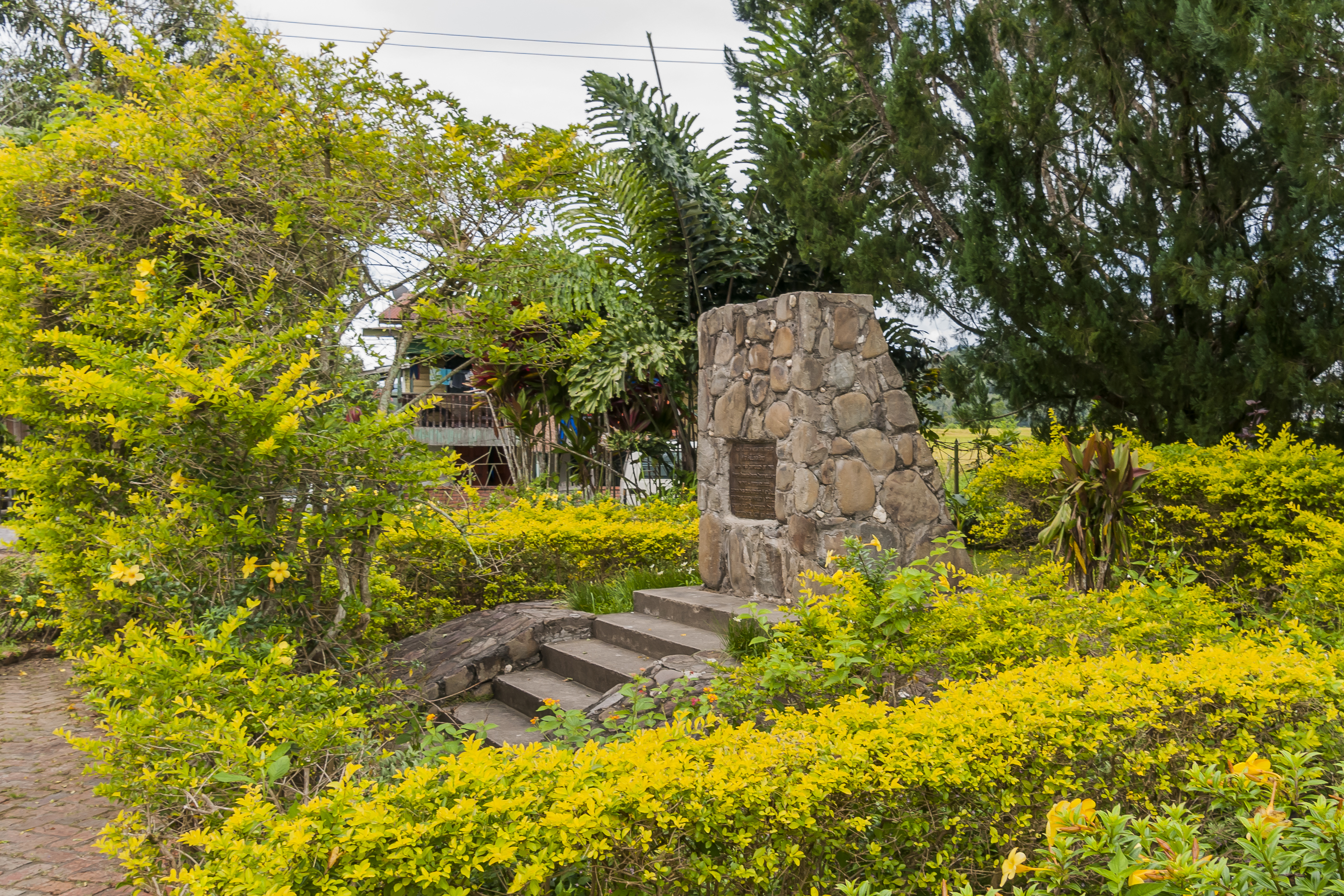
Memorial Stone near Tambunan, Sabah, Malaysia, marking the former location of Mat Salleh's fort and also the place where he met his death in 1900

The company sent a force to retaliate. They reached Tambunan on 31 December 1899 and fighting commenced the next day. On 10 January 1900, the village of Laland was captured by the company. Mat Salleh lost 60 men. On 15 January 1900, the company proceeded to acquire Taga villages and the fort of one of Mat Salleh's chief lieutenants; Mat Sator was burned by shell-fire, rendered unconscious, but he did not die. They then cut the water supply to Mat Salleh's fort by diverting the Pengkalian River to the Sensuran. On 27 January 1900, Mat Salleh's fort was surrounded and shelled continuously for the next four days. The seemingly impenetrable fort finally fell due to a massive onslaught by the company.

On 31 January 1900, Mat Salleh was killed by machine gun-fire by mid-day. (Note: There are conflicting accounts for the date of Mat Salleh's death. Almost all sources state 31 January 1900, but there are a few that state 1 February 1900) A chance shot from a Maxim Gun had hit Mat Salleh in the left temple, killing him instantly. (Note: Some claim that Mat Salleh did not die during the Tambunan attack. In an interview conducted by a reporter from the Malaysian newspaper Bernama, Petrus Podtung Kuyog, 73, the grandson to one of Mat Salleh's followers strongly asserted that according to his grandmother, Giok's account; on 31 January 1900, Mat Salleh survived the attack and fled with his wife before going into hiding. His deputy was killed and was mistaken by the Company for Mat Salleh.) Also killed in the battle were about 1,000 of Mat Salleh's followers who fought from the neighbouring villages of Lotud Tondulu, Piasau, Kitutud, Kepayan and Sunsuron.

It was, however, another five years before the remnants of Mat Salleh's men surrendered, were killed or captured by the company, resulting in the end of the rebellion in 1905.

== Mat Salleh's memorial ==
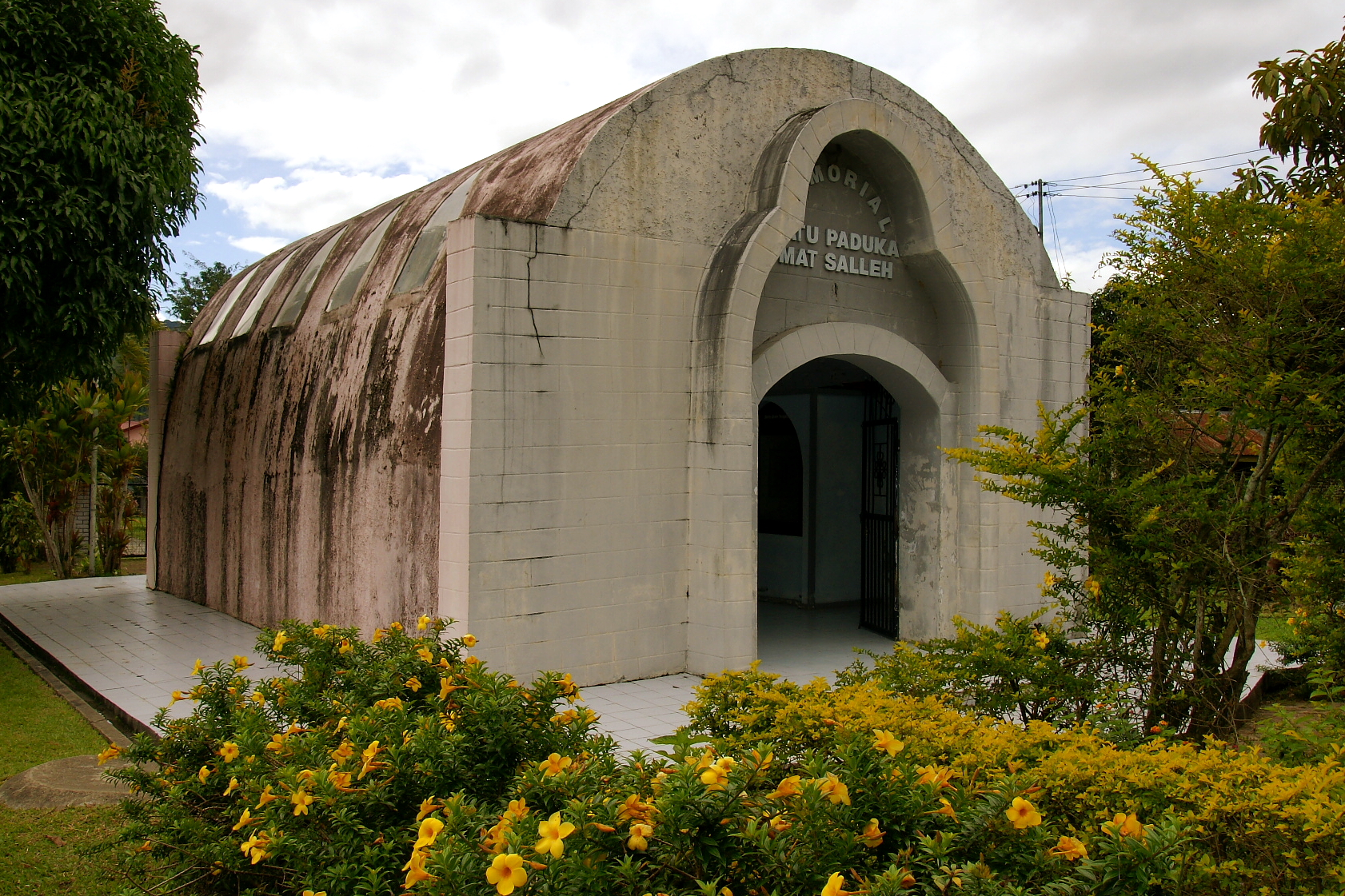
Mat Salleh Memorial near Tambunan, Sabah, Malaysia (demolished in 2015)

The Mat Salleh memorial was opened in 1999 at the site where he was killed at Kampung Tibabar in Tambunan. It was demolished in 2015.

The memorial, which resembled a fort, was surrounded by a garden. It housed Mat Salleh's photograph and some photos of his weapons and paraphernalia from the rebellion he led. A bronze plaque, set apart some metres from the building, still stands there and reads:

This plaque marks the site of Mat Salleh's Fort which was captured by the North Borneo Armed Constabulary on the 1st February 1900. During this engagement, Mat Salleh, who for six years led a rebellion against the British Charted Company administration, met his death.

After the memorial was opened, an article published in The New Straits Times on 9 March 2000 reported Sabah museum director and Tambunan local, Joseph Pounis Guntavid, as suggesting that "a search and study on Mat Salleh's actions strongly indicated that he was not a rebel but a warrior who went against foreign rule, fighting for North Borneo 'self-government'...Mat Salleh initiated patriotism that led the people to fight for self-rule until Sabah gained her independence through Malaysia on 16 September 1963".

Mat Salleh, however, is not always seen as a hero. Many writers of this rebellion see Mat Salleh as a lone crusader or an opportunist solely interested in restoring his precolonial social position of power. To the British North Borneo Chartered Company, he was a rebel and troublemaker, while to his supporters, he was a fierce and skilled warrior, a reputation which remains today.
