= Rickarton =

Settlement in Aberdeenshire

Coordinates: 56°59′34.1″N 2°18′15.93″W

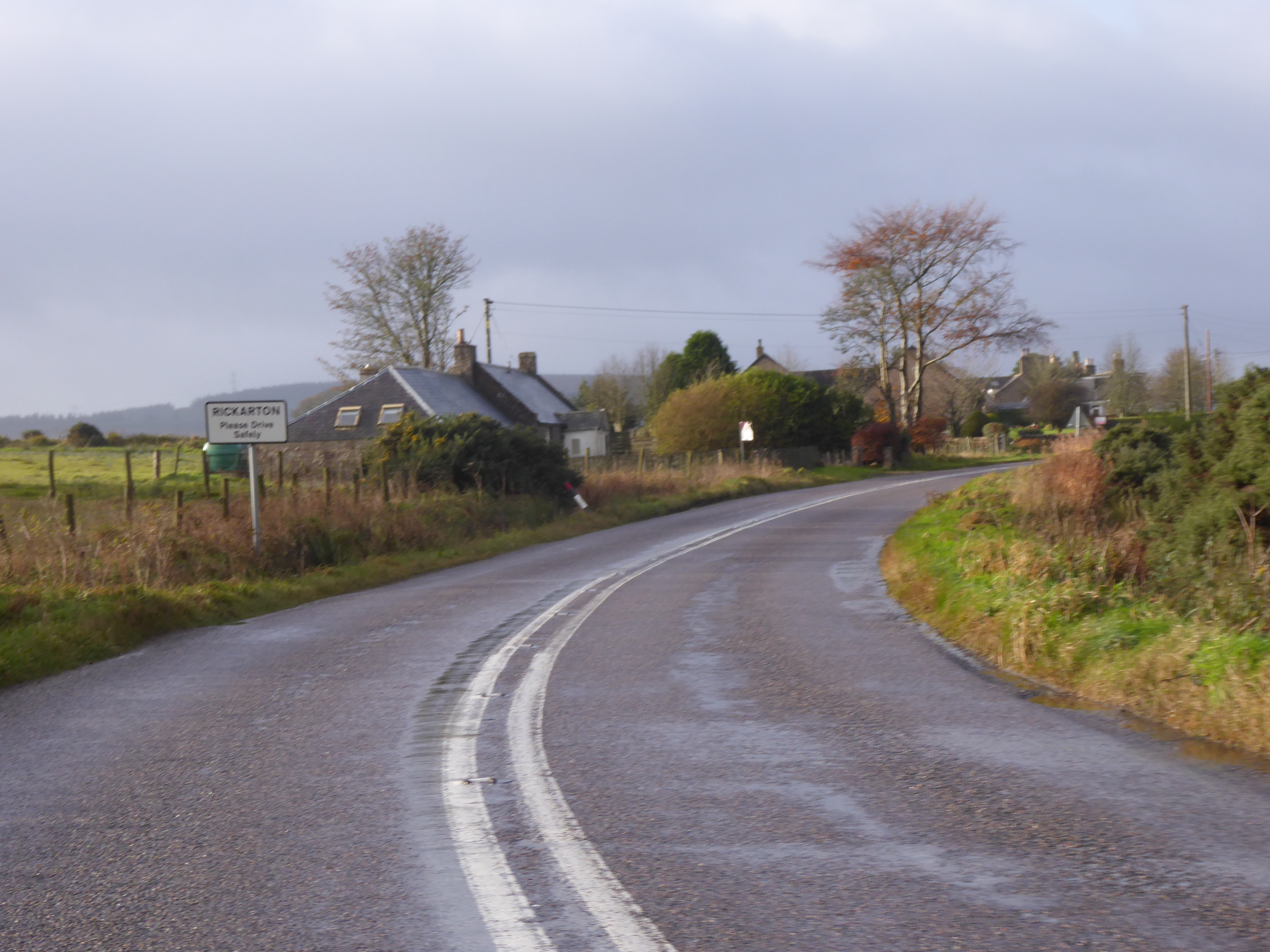
The A957 entering Rickarton from the east (2017)

Rickarton is a settlement in Aberdeenshire. It is situated on the A957 to the northwest of Stonehaven.

Rickarton was served by the 105 bus between Stonehaven and Banchory until its withdrawal in 2018.

Rickarton formerly had a primary school and a post office. The school closed in 1971.

During the second world war, a German plane came down. One local man was killed by a piece of the plane.

== Church ==
The Church of Scotland parish of Rickarton was endowed by a bequest of George Thomson, the then minister of Fetteresso. He bequeathed the residue of his estate for the church. The church building was constructed in 1871 and the parish was disjoined from Fetteresso Church in Stonehaven, and Glenbervie, on 22 January 1872. Between 28 February 1933 and 16 July 1948, the parish was linked with Fetteresso Church. From 31 May 1967, it was linked with Durris. However, this linkage was terminated on 6 November 1979, after the retirement of their minister in May. On 28 February 1980 the congregation was dissolved (closed). The congregation sat within the Presbytery of Fordoun, then Aberdeen, and then latterly in Kincardine and Deeside.

=== Ministers of the Church ===
- John Reith, 1872-1898
- James Scott Naismith, 1899-1906
- Robert Scarth Valentine Logie, 1906-1919
- Francis M'Hardy, 1919-1923
- Joseph M'Kenzie M'Pherson, 1924-1929
- Alexander Christian William Saunders 1929-1933
- Andrew John Oliphant 1948-1959
- John Wilson Blair 1961-1967
- William Adamson Southwell 1968-1979

=== War Memorial ===
The War Memorial, now placed outside the deconsecrated church building, records 10 local men dying in the First World War, and two in the Second World War.
