= Alexander Rankin Dunlop =

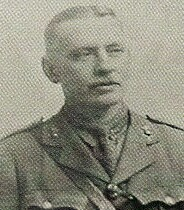
Alexander R. Dunlop.

Alexander Rankin Dunlop (23 September 1868 in Pictou, Nova Scotia, British North America; – 8 August 1946 in Worthing, England) was the first British Resident in Tawau of North Borneo.

== Personal life ==
Dunlop was born on 23 September 1868 as the third of four children of a Scottish family. His father, Henry Dunlop, emigrated from Glasgow to Canada with his wife Sarah Mackay in 1864. The Dunlop family lived in New York in 1880, where his father had found work as a cotton spinner. The family then moved to California to try their luck as a farmer.

=== Career in North Borneo Chartered Company ===
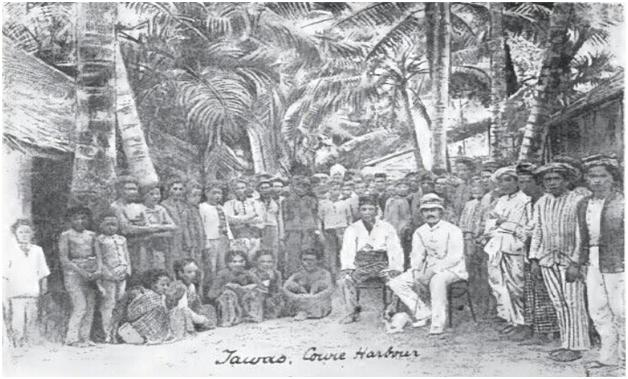
Tawau residents and their community chief with Dunlop (sitting right) in the Cowie Harbour of Tawau, circa 1885.

In 1885, Dunlop moved to North Borneo to work under the North Borneo Chartered Company as an administrative officer. He entered the service of the company and becomes acquainted. In October 1886, he accompanied Governor William Hood Treacher on an inspection tour in the West Coast Residency and to Silam in Lahad Datu. (Note: In Silam in 1884, the Agricultural Research Station (BNB Agricultural Research Station) has been established.) In 1888, he left the company for unknown reasons, but returned to the position of a second-level administrative officer in 1890 for the settlement areas of Labuk and Sugut, and was thus able to gain valuable knowledge of the local tribes, including those to where Mat Salleh belonged. In this time also he participate in various expeditions such as Gunsayat (1889), Labut and Sugut (1890), Penungah after Padas (1890) and Omadal (1892). Several of his accounts of these expeditions are part of the linguistic-anthropological source literature on North Borneo's indigenous groups. (Note: The following expeditions are quoted: 1889 - Result of his expedition (BNBH 7 (9): 280); 1890 - Labuk, Sugut District report (BNBH 8 (6): 180–182); 1890 - Report on an expedition from Penungah to Padas (BNBH 8 (11): 344–348).) He arrived at Sandakan on 24 August 1891 as assistant resident-in-charge of Penungah and the interior. Since this coincides with the end of service of William Burgess Pryer, the resident of the East Coast, the occasion was probably the passing of Pryer.

Most of the time between 1892 and 1903, Dunlop had held various government offices in or near Tawau. This however, had little to do with pure administrative activity; for example, he participated in various punitive expeditions against the insurgents under Mat Salleh in 1896 and 1898 and against Kamunta (Note: Kamunta was one of the followers of Mat Salleh, who tried shortly after Salleh death to continue the rebellion. He was arrested in 1902 in Kudat and sentenced to death.) in 1901. After the company's annual Christmas dinner in London in late 1897, he accompanied William Clark Cowie on a journey back to North Borneo. It is likely that he also accompanied Cowie to Menggatal to assist in the negotiations with Mat Salleh. Two years later, he commanded under the command of C.H. Harrison the attack on the Mat Salleh fort in Tambunan, in which Mat Salleh was killed on 31 December 1900. His detailed and illustrated diary records of the final battle are now kept in the Sabah State Archives.

At the end of 1901, Dunlop was withdrawn from the East Coast and appointed as the Resident of the West Coast. Together with his colleagues from the other divisions, he represents the second highest administrative body of North Borneo after the governor and enjoys some privileges such as trip to the company's annual Christmas dinner in London, which he attends on 8 December 1903 and which he joins a longer home leave from which he returns on 1 April 1904. The area that was to be managed by Dunlop was expanded in May 1905 to the administration of the province of Alcock. The West Coast Residency was the company's largest and most important resident with Dunlop became the second top official in northern Borneo.

Corresponding statements in the newspapers of the time suggest that "the jungle man" Dunlop could not only adapt himself excellently to the peculiarities of a life in the tropical jungle, but that he had also won the respect and appreciation of the native tribes.

== Later life and death ==
In November 1910, he married Myfanwy Davonport Shrubsole, with whom he has a daughter named Hazel. His wife health condition was suddenly deteriorating in 1914 that forcing him to quit his service at the North Borneo Chartered Company and depart to Europe from Sandakan on 28 March. He returned to North Borneo on 21 July 1927. The following year, he founded a company for the prospecting of gold in Borneo although his attempts to find in the jungle were unsuccessful. Dunlop died on 8 August 1946 at Semperna Cissbury Road Ferring, Worthing, West Sussex in England.

== Legacy ==
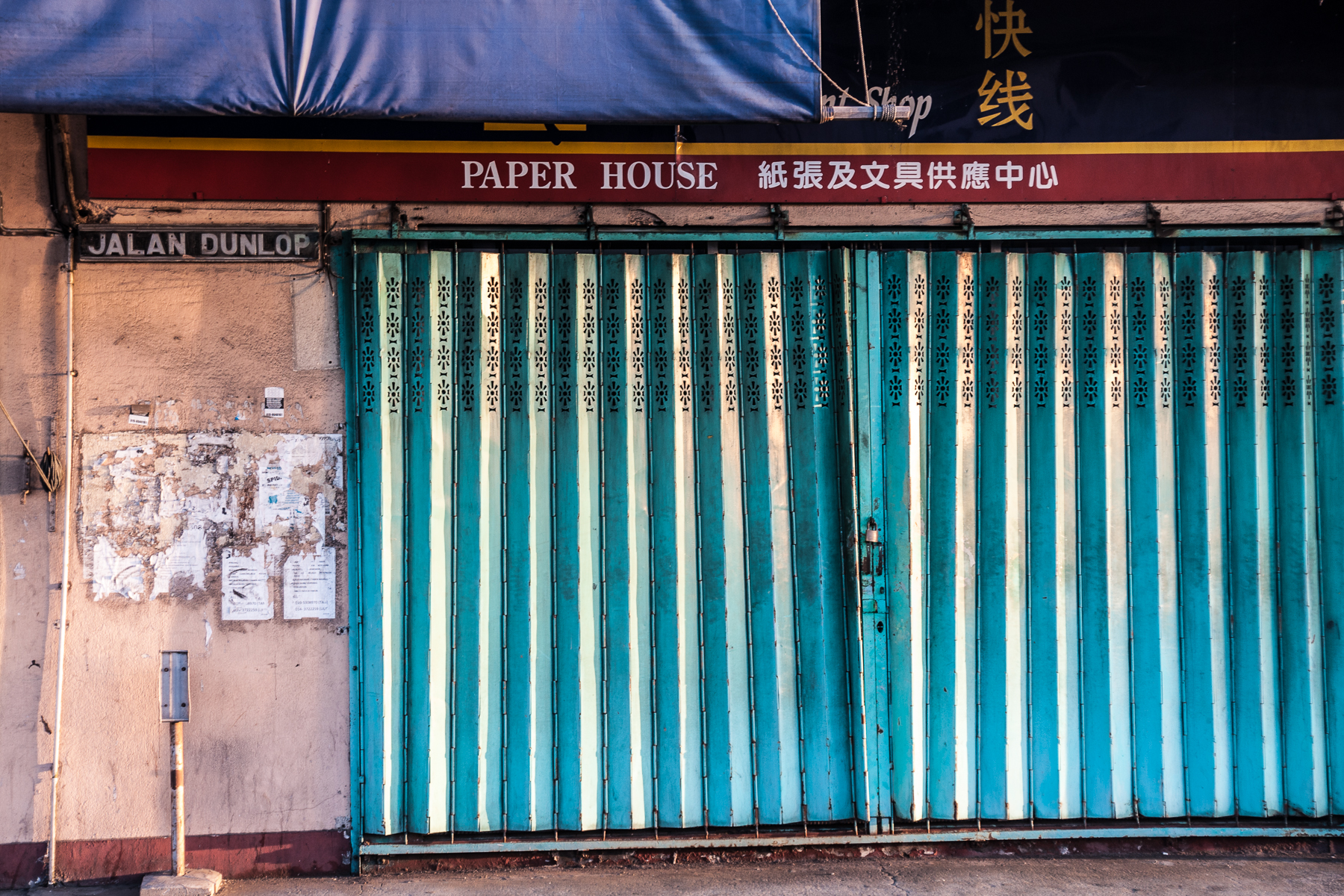
Plate in the old shoplots building in Tawau marking the Dunlop Street.

Dunlop Street, one of the two main streets in Tawau is named after him.

== Literature ==
- Tregonning, K. G. (1965). A History Of Modern Sabah (North Borneo 1881–1963). University of Malaya Press.
- Sabah State Archives (2007). Datu Paduka Mat Salleh – Hero of Sabah (1894–1900). Sabah State Archives.
- Goodlet, Ken (2010). Tawau – The Making of a Tropical Community. Opus Publications. ISBN 978-983-3987-38-2.
