= Kwijau Rebellion =

1896 armed conflict in North Borneo

| Date | 1896 |
| Location | Keningau District, North Borneo |
| Result | North Borneo Company victory, Kwijau surrendered and sentenced to hard labour |

Belligerents
| North Borneo Chartered Company | Kwijau rebels |

Commanders and leaders
| (North Borneo) Edward Henry Barraut; P. Wise | Kwijau chiefs |

Units involved
| British North Borneo Constabulary | |

Casualties and losses
| | 8x chiefs arrested; 2x villages attacked |

The Kwijau Rebellion (Kuijau or Kweejow) was an armed conflict in North Borneo (present day Sabah) between the North Borneo Chartered Company and several tribes of the Kwijau who resisted against the imposition of Company-rule and poor labour conditions.

== History ==
=== Background ===
In 1896, a representative of the British North Borneo Company named Edward Henry Barraut was placed as the District Officer of the Keningau District. His primary responsibility involved the oversight of the construction of a telegraph line through the district. For the bulk of construction activities in this period, the Company resorted to the labour of local tribesmen.

While some tribes eagerly agreed to modernize the interior, other tribes did not agree to work on the projects, and refused to swear allegiance to the Company. In their view, the telegraph represented the colonizer as a symbol, and it also cut straight through the land occupied by these local tribes.

In the hills above the Keningau Plain, the Kwijau tribe of the Pampang River made preparations to launch an attack against District Officer Barraut, joining forces with at least 7 other Kwijau tribes near the Keningau area.

=== Rebellion ===
Early in May 1896, Barraut was informed of the plot on his life. He telephoned the coast for assistance, but their reinforcements were at least a three days' march away.

The Pampang River tribe then came into Barraut's office, on the guise of obtaining work. They attacked, but he was able to repel the attack. The Kwijau had also blocked the path up from the coast.

On the advice of several Murut chiefs, Barraut went on the offensive. He brought a small police detachment of the British North Borneo Constabulary with him to surround a Kwijau village and demanded their surrender. The village refused, and Barraut led an attack on it. Barraut and the Constabulary detachment then moved to a second Kwijau village and attacked it, forcing their surrender.

After attacking the second village, Barraut and the Constabulary returned to base, and gave the rest of the Kwijau tribes a week to surrender. Eight Kwijau chiefs surrendered before the week was out.

Percy Wise arrived from Labuan leading a contingent of reinforcements. The eight chiefs who had surrendered were then tried in the court, and sentenced to terms of imprisonment, including hard labour. These ringleaders of the rebellion were then sent to the gaol at Sandakan.

The remaining chiefs formally surrendered at a Planting of the Stone ceremony. As a condition of their surrender, the remainder of the Kwijau rebel tribesmen were then conscripted as hard laborers working on some of the same construction projects they had rebelled against. They were also forced to relocate their villages closer to the station, and to swear allegiance to the Company.
