= Leicester Paul Beaufort =

British barrister and colonial governor of North Borneo

Sir Leicester Paul Beaufort (13 December 1853 – 12 August 1926), was a British barrister and colonial governor of North Borneo.

== Early life ==
Beaufort was the second son of the Reverend Daniel Augustus Beaufort of Warburton, Cheshire and his wife Emily Newel, daughter of Sir John Davis, former Governor of Hong Kong. His grandfather on the paternal side was Rear Admiral Sir Francis Beaufort.

== Education ==
Beaufort was educated at Westminster School and the University of Oxford, graduating as a Master of Arts and Bachelor of Civil Law. He was called to the bar at the Inner Temple in 1879. In 1888 he was elected to the London School Board as one of the representatives of Greenwich.

== Career ==
In 1889 he began his career in colonial administration when he was appointed a judicial commissioner and government secretary in British North Borneo. From 1895 to 1899 he was Governor of North Borneo and Commander in Chief of the Colony of Labuan. From 1901 to 1911 he was Chief Justice of North-Eastern Rhodesia and from 1911 to 1918 a judge of the High Court of Northern Rhodesia.

He retired in 1918 and lived at Wynberg, Cape Colony. He was knighted in 1919.

== Family life ==
In 1883 he married Edith Mary Griffith, daughter of an Anglican clergyman.

Government offices
Preceded by Charles Vandeleur Creagh	Governor of North Borneo; 1895–1899	Succeeded by Hugh Charles Clifford
