= Sugut River =

River in Sabah, Malaysia

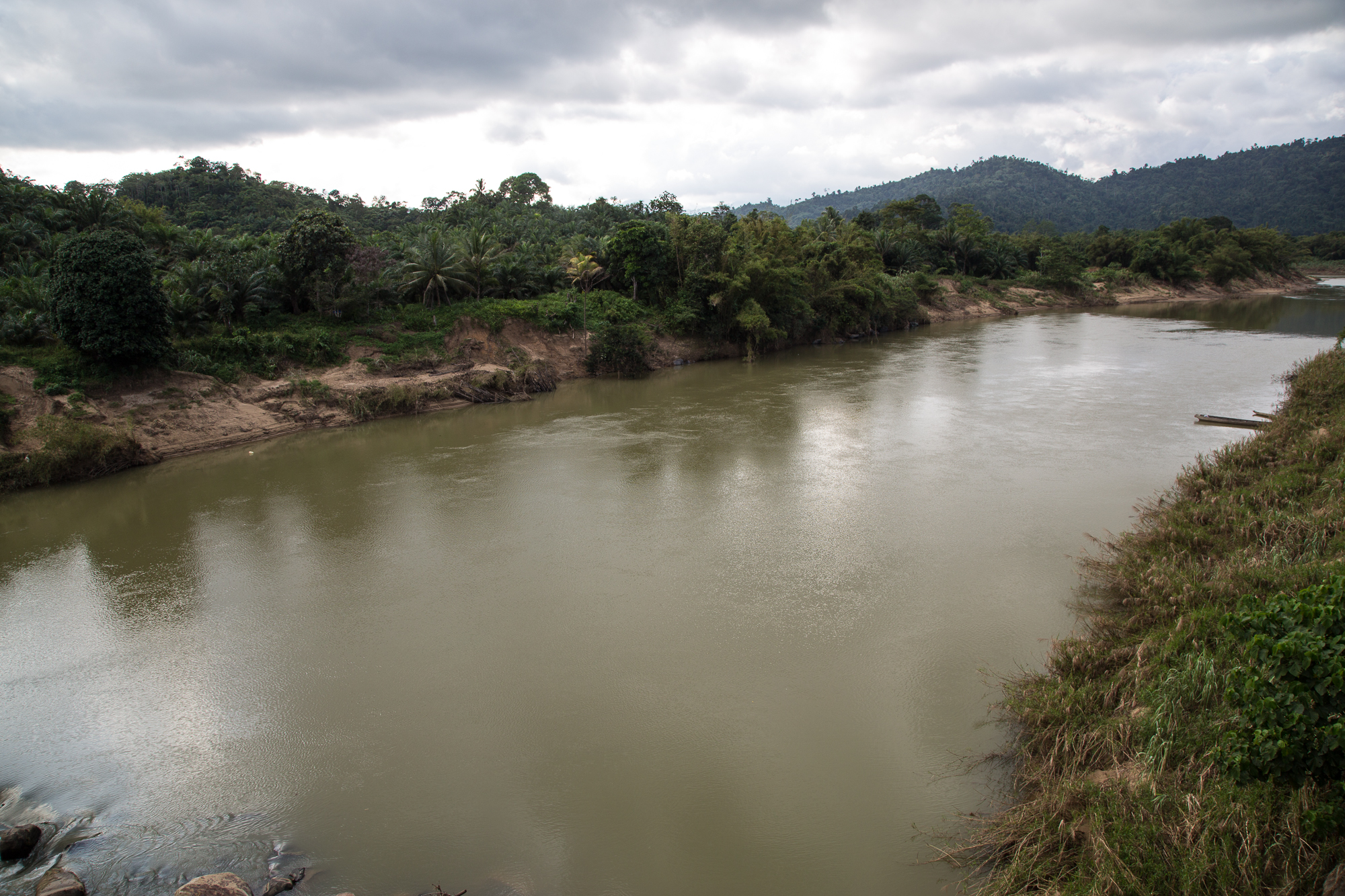
- View of the river.
- Native name: Sungai Sugut (Malay)

Location
- Country: Malaysia
- State: Sabah
- Division: Kudat Division, Sandakan Division, West Coast Division
- Precise location: Northeastern Borneo

Physical characteristics
- Source
  - location: From the eastern slopes of Mount Kinabalu National Park in Ranau District
- Mouth
  - location: At Beluran District into Sulu Sea
  - coordinates: 6°26′22.5″N 117°43′43.6″E
  - elevation: Sea level
- Length: 178 km (111 mi)
- Basin size: 3,094 km^{2} (1,195 sq mi)
- Discharge
  - location: Near mouth
  - average: 7.34 km^{3}/a (233 m^{3}/s)

Basin features
- Progression: Sulu Sea
- River system: Sugut River

The Sugut River (Malay: Sungai Sugut, Kadazan Dusun: Bawang Sugut) is a river located in the northeastern part of Sabah, Malaysia, between the tripoint of the West Coast, Sandakan as well as a portion of the Kudat division (Kota Marudu district). It has a total length of 178 km (111 miles) from its headwaters in the mountains of northwest Sabah to its outlet at the Sulu Sea, northeastern of Beluran town. Its source is originated from the mountains in the eastern slopes of Mount Kinabalu National Park in Ranau District, which forms part of the Mount Kinabalu river system.

== Conservation efforts ==
Some of the distinctive features of the Sugut River landscape include the dry land forest on sandstone hills, riverine forests and oxbow lakes, where it become the natural breeding ground for an abundance of wildlife, including macaques, mousedeer, muntjac, orangutan, proboscis monkeys, sambar deer, silvered langurs, sun bear, wild pig as well as variety of bird species, including 43 species of freshwater fish. The Trusan Sugut of the river mouth is part of the Sugut Conservation Area (SCA), which was initially gazetted as a Class II commercial forest and later reclassified as a Class I Protection Forest on 24 December 2014. In 2015, the World Wide Fund for Nature (WWF) recording the importance of the waterway for villagers as part of a three-year freshwater ecosystem conservation project of the WWF.

== Features ==
The river flows from the Mount Kinabalu system through an extensive alluvial plain before arriving at the Sulu Sea. Along the river also located the Trusan Sugut Forest Reserve.

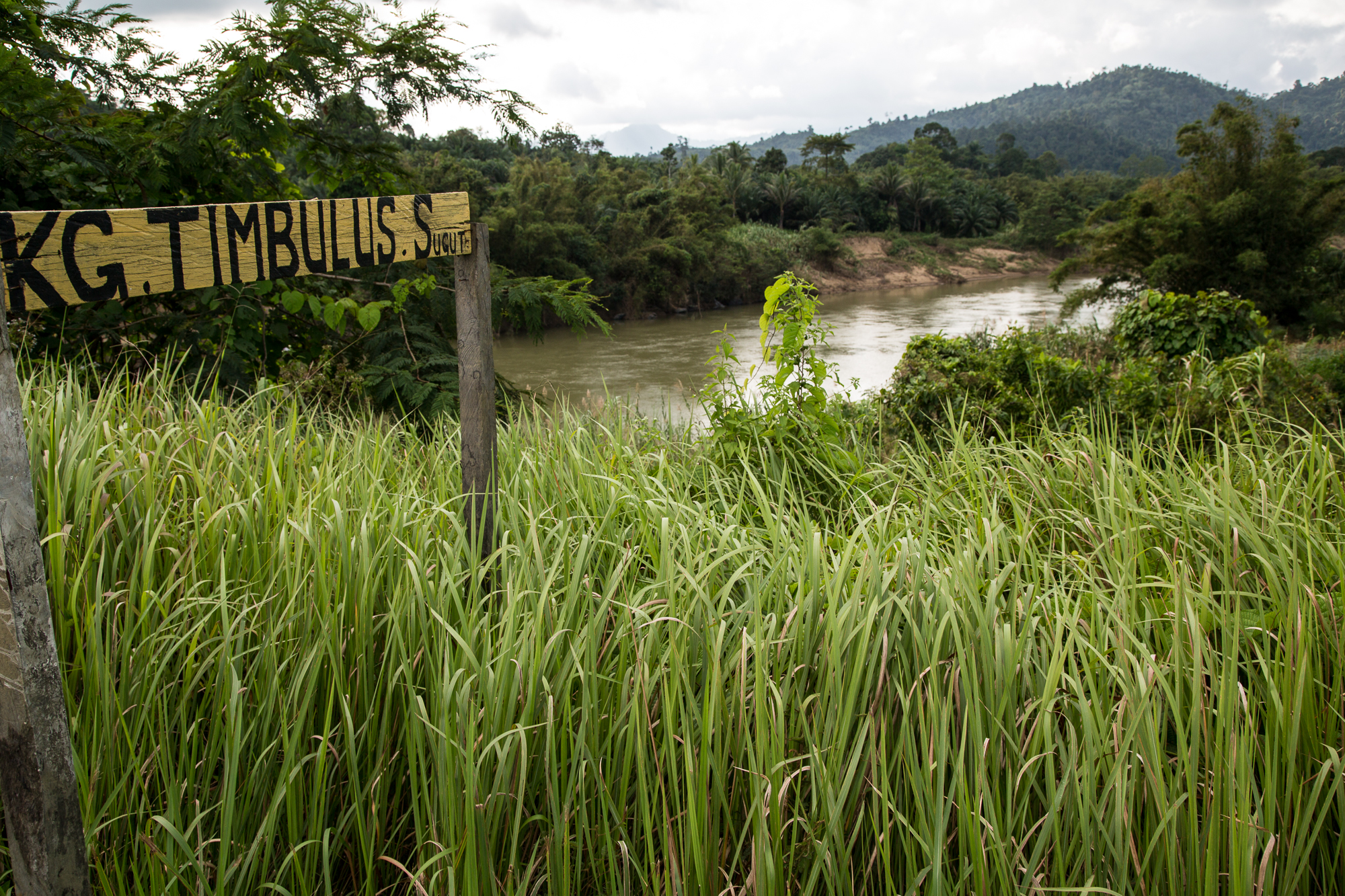
Signboard of Timbulus Village beside the river

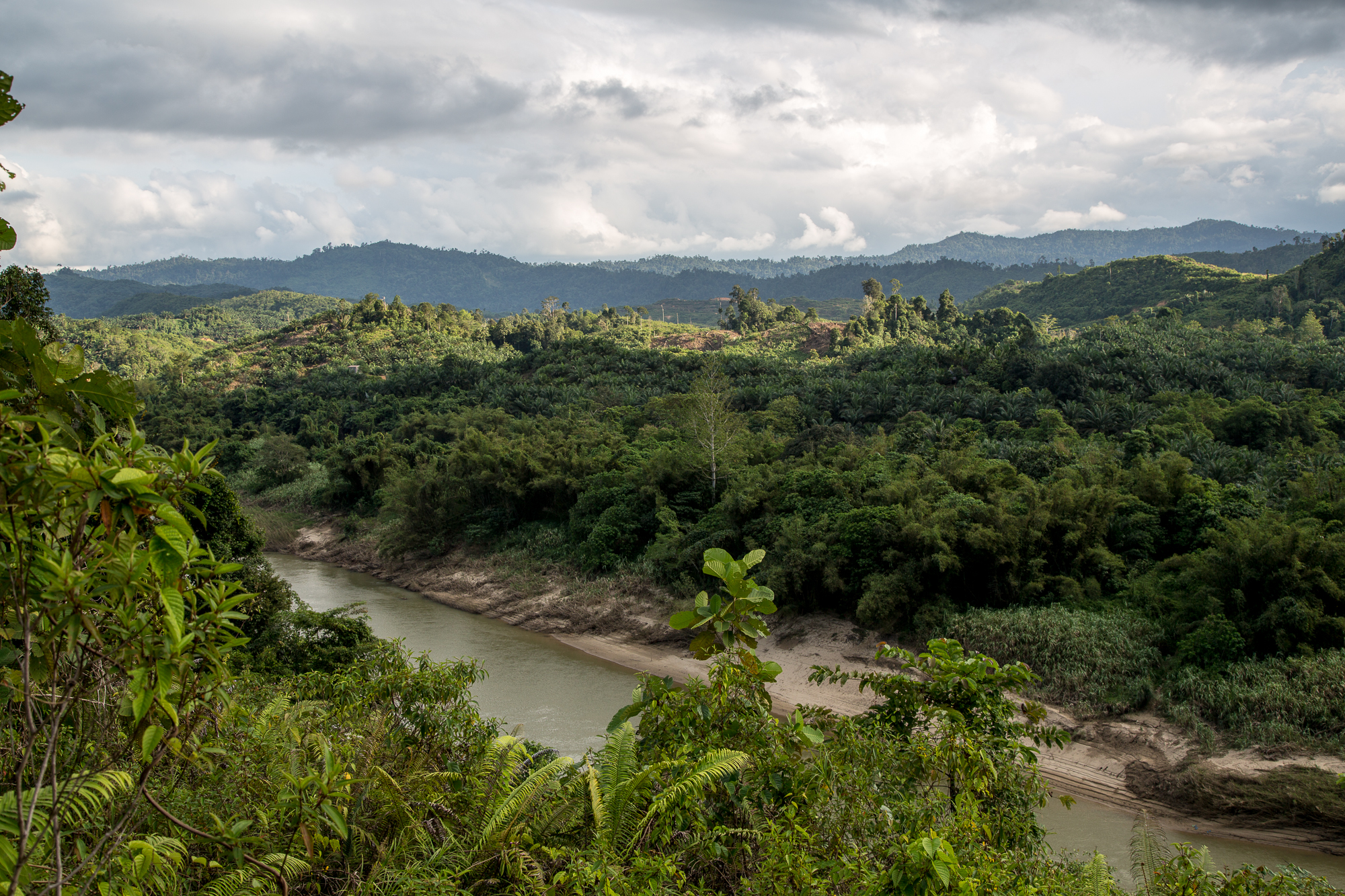
Sunlight over the vegetation covered by clouds as seen afar

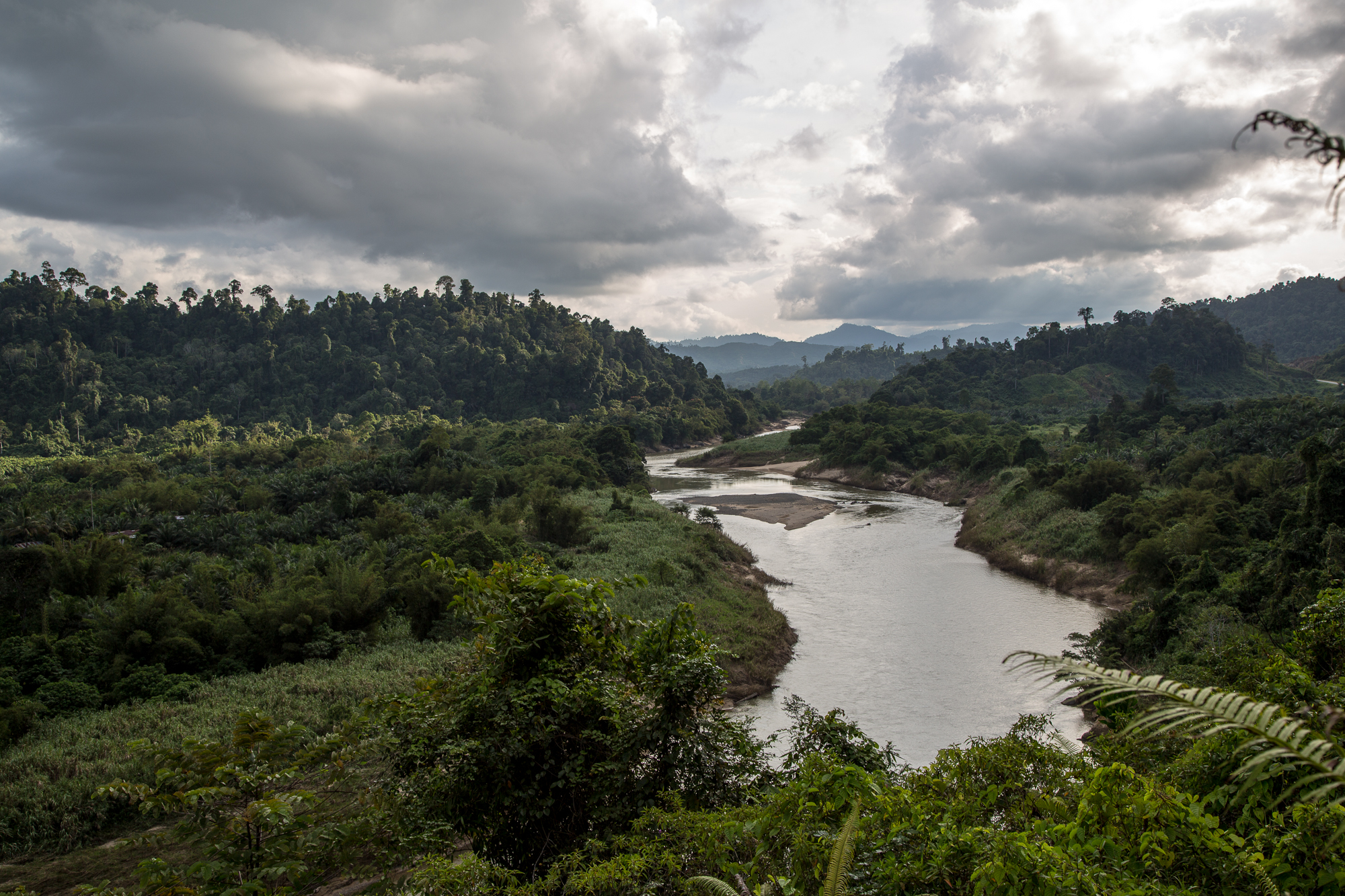
The river with surrounding vegetation

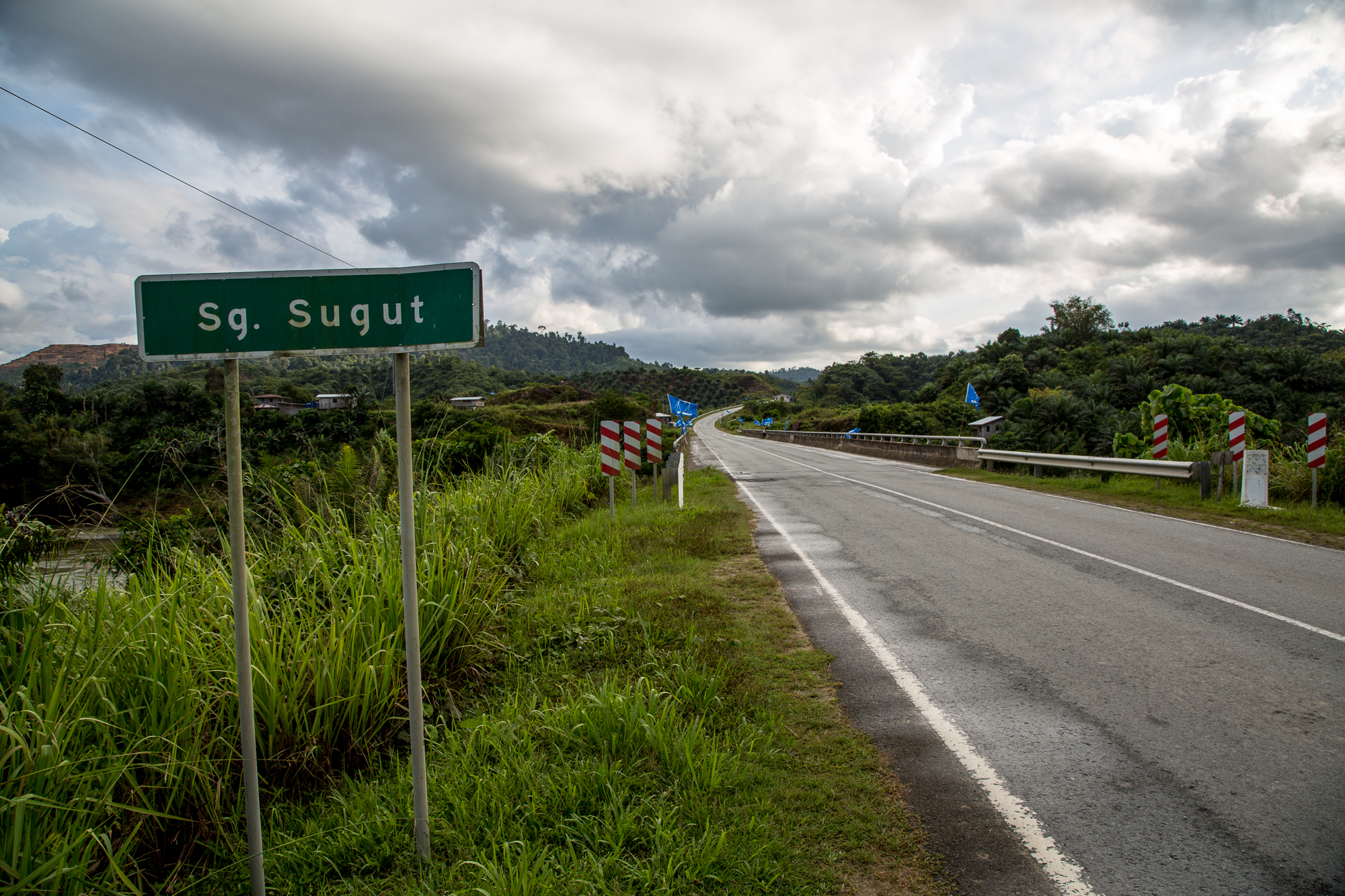
Vehicle bridge passing through the river, Sapi-Nangoh Highway

== See also ==
- List of rivers of Malaysia
