= Planting of the Stone =

Ancient oath taking ceremony in the Malay Archipelago

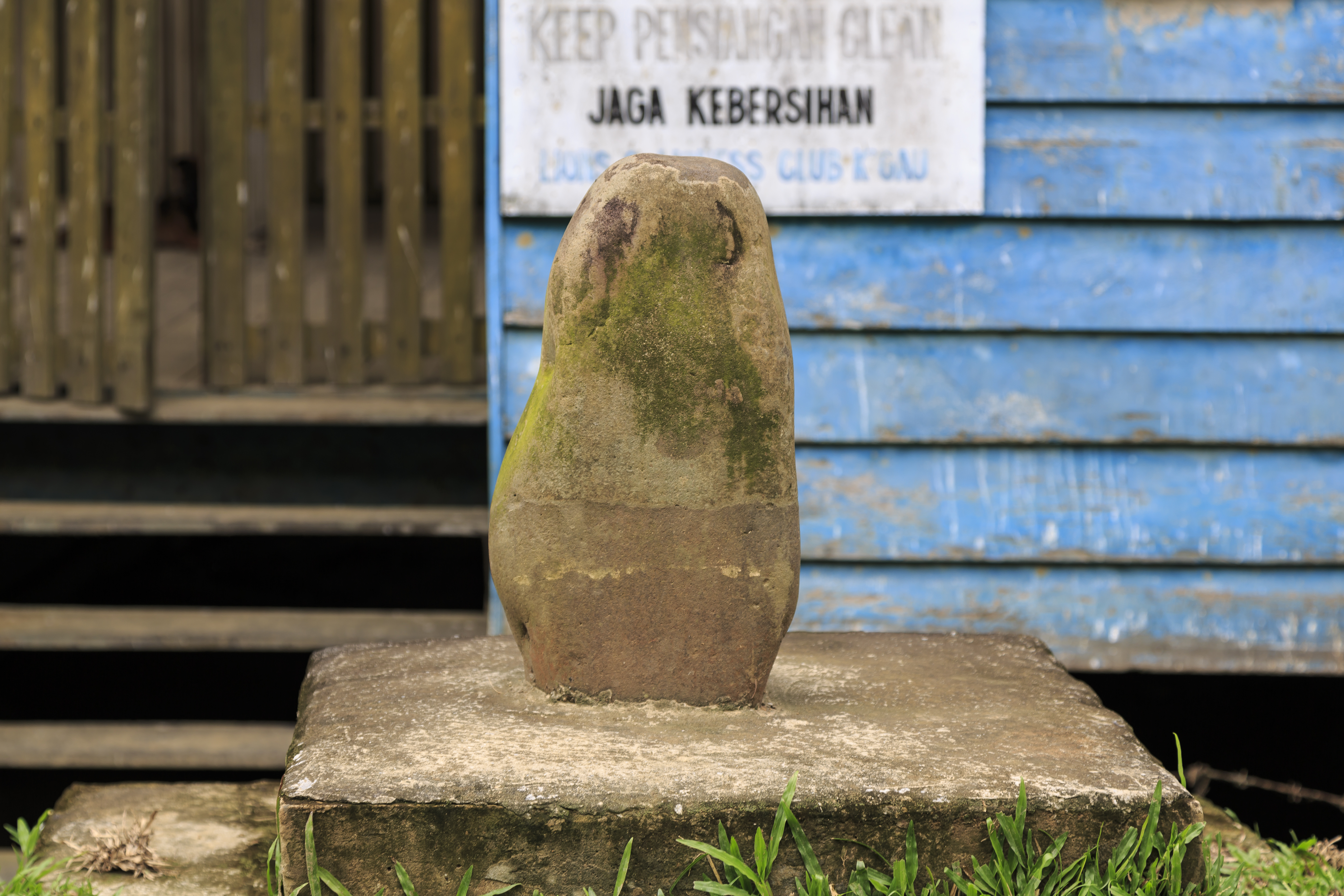
An oath stone at Pensiangan placed into a concrete platform.

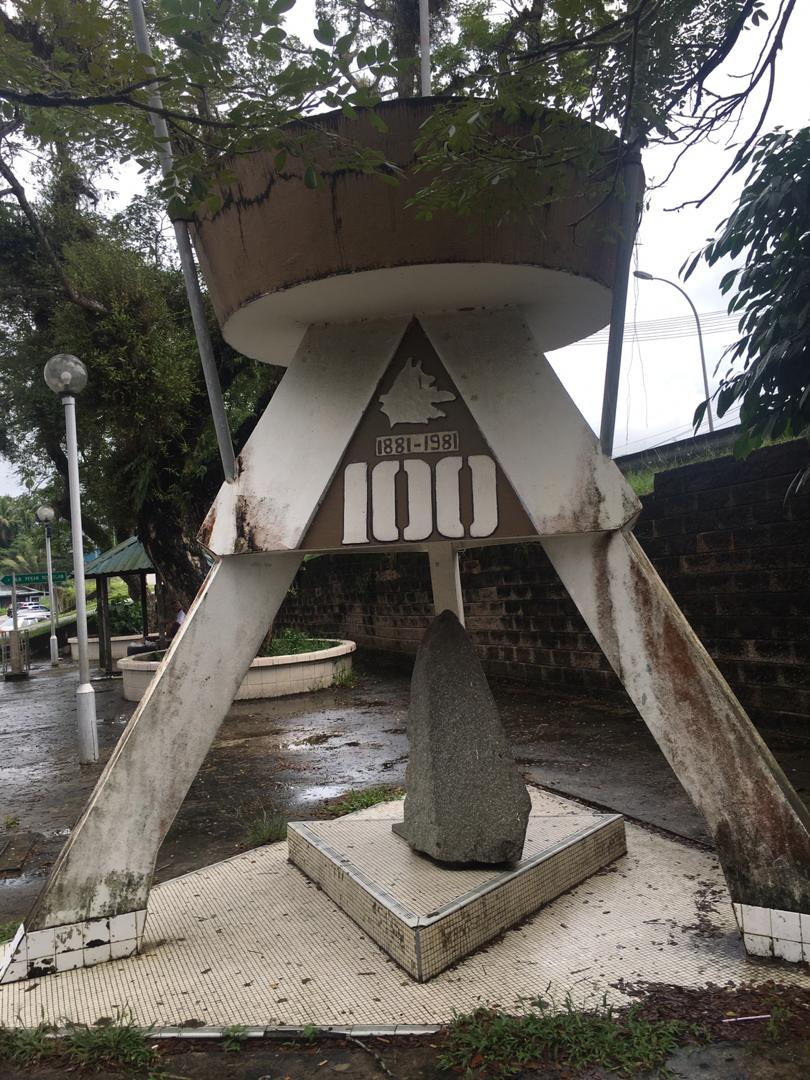
This oath stone in Tenghilan has another structure surrounding it called the "Sabah Memorial Monument," noting the 100-year anniversary of the oath taken here.

The Planting of the Stone or the Stone Planting Ceremony, in the ancient indigenous animist cultures of certain areas of Borneo, the Sulu Archipelago, Brunei, Malaysia and Indonesia, is an official ceremony that uses an oath stone (Malay: Batu Sumpah) to denote an arrangement between the gods and humanity. Some tribes later adapted these ceremonies to Christianity or Islam, making the arrangement with the monotheistic God. Some form of oath is taken, and if the terms of the oath are broken, it is understood that the gods will curse the oath breaker with great suffering. This ceremony has been practiced by certain Murut people, Dusun people, and others.

The oath stones of the Malay archipelago should not be confused with other oath stones, or oathstones, which are found in many other ancient cultures around the world, including in Ancient Greece, the oathing stones of Scotland, and in Judaism, as mentioned in Bible (Genesis 31: 44–54), as their forms and ceremonies differ wildly from culture to culture.

== Traditional ceremony ==
=== The stones ===
These oath stones, which are a smaller form of menhir, are mostly known to be erected for two purposes; firstly, the official surrender and peace agreement between warring parties, and secondly, to denote the official trade regulations of tamu found in the archipelagos. This ceremony may be used to represent the oath of an individual or a group. These oath stones, however, are different from boundary marker stones, guardian stones (Malay: Zingolig), burial stones, memorial stones, or living stones (Malay: Batu Hidup).

The ceremonial oath stone here should be a stone collected from a source considered sacred to the tribe, usually from a river, cylindrical in shape, about 2 feet long and 6 inches in diameter. If the stone is larger, it should maintain roughly the same aspect ratio. However, around the time of the merger between Sabah and Malaysia, these stones were found to be taller than the people present, and in various shapes.

This ceremony also requires a small quantity of rice and salt, and a bowl of water. Also needed is a local water buffalo.

First, a hole is dug in the ground deep enough to bury about two-thirds of the oath stone, but the stone is not yet placed inside.

=== Prayers and oaths ===
A principal representative of the oath-taking party prays in the direction of the heavens, the earth, and the water. The representative howls this prayer to the Gods (or in ceremonies adapted to Christianity or Islam, to God) to ask them to bear witness to their oath. They then proceed to invoke all of the misfortunes that the deity will make them suffer if they betray the oath they are about to make.

The oath recorded upon the surrender of Si Gunting at the end of the Sigunting War was:

"If I climb a coconut, may I fall; if I enter a river, may a crocodile take me; may my children die; may my wife be unfaithful and die; may I die; may monkeys eat my crops; may my salt melt and be absorbed and may I perish as it does when cast into water."

The representative takes a handful of rice and throws it into the wind. They take a pinch of salt and place it into the bowl of water. They recite the terms of the surrender to a representative of the other party, which are specific to each situation.

Prompters, at specific moments, will add to the communication through chant with suggestions of additional duties and actions that must be performed by the representative. It is understood that any violation of the oath will involve catastrophe. In a ceremony of surrender, the victors must also abide by the terms of the oath, and if they abandon the oath, they too will suffer certain supernatural curses. If anyone ever removes the stone, the terms of surrender are also considered null and void until it is reconsecrated.

=== Blood sacrifice ===
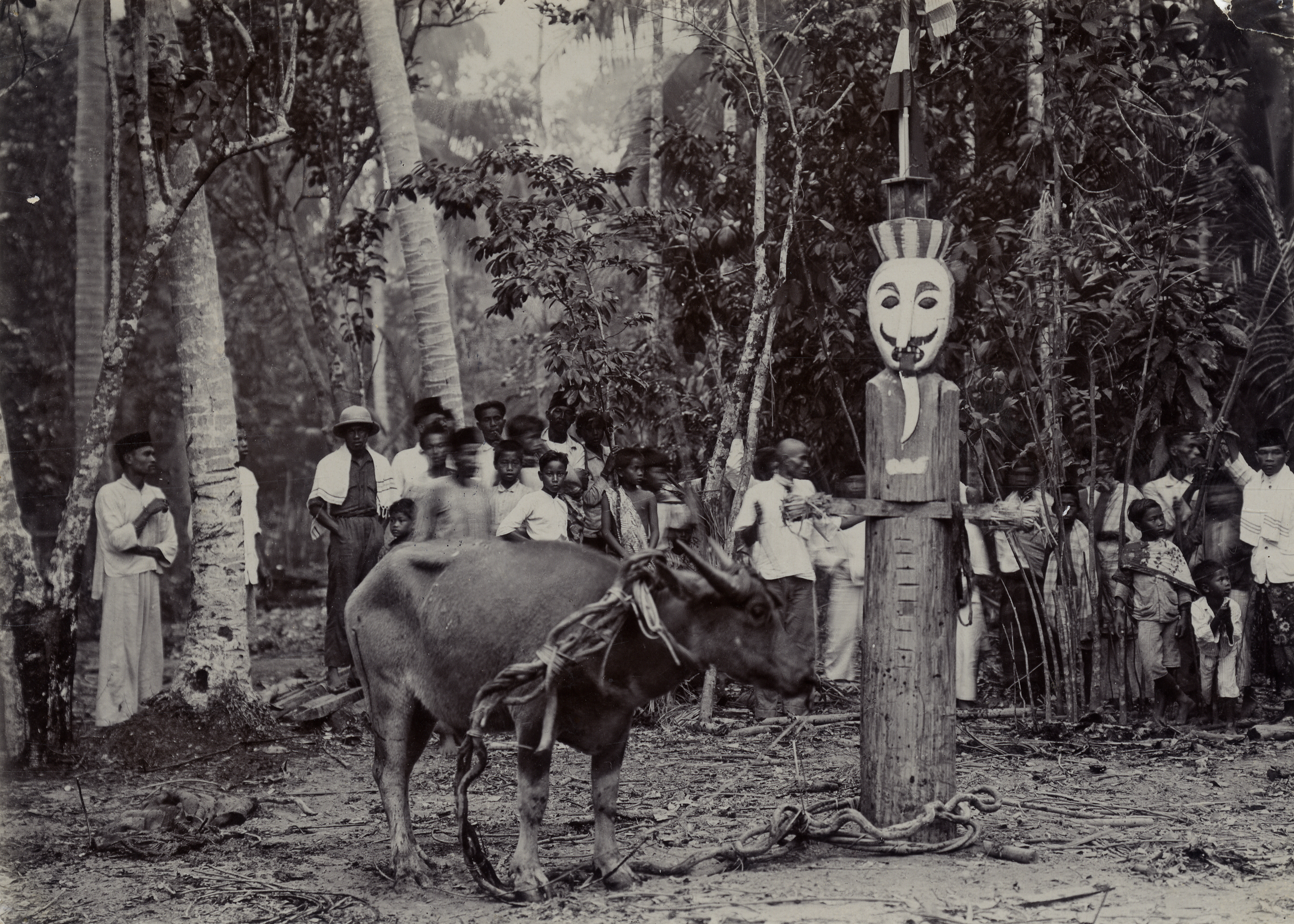
Buffalo were often used to perform blood sacrifice in Borneo. This one is pictured on the Indonesian part of the island in a different kind of ceremony.

The buffalo is brought forward, and placed near the hole. A bobolian or bobohizan (priest or priestess) will cut its throat in an act of animal sacrifice, and its blood is then poured into the hole. If a buffalo cannot be used, on some occasions it is acceptable to use a pig, a chicken, or another form of animal or fowl.

Thousands of years ago, before animals were used as sacrifice, this ceremony often involved a human sacrifice instead.

The oath stone is then placed into the hole, upon which it spiritually records the oath. Blood mixed with mud is then smeared onto the side of the stone. The bobolian then makes a small incantation or prayer.

The stone being placed, now the animal is butchered, and its remains are used for a celebratory feast.

== See also ==
- Keningau Oath Stone
- Inanam Tamu
