= Kawang Amok =

Military conflict in North Borneo (1895)

- Part of Kandurong War
Date	10 May 1885 – 17 May 1885
Location	Kawang, Papar District, North Borneo

Belligerents
North Borneo Chartered Company	Taga'has tribe

Commanders and leaders
(North Borneo) Alexander Mortier de Fontaine †; (North Borneo) G. L. Davies; (North Borneo) Donald Manson Fraser †; (North Borneo) Robert McEwen Little; (North Borneo) J. E. G. Wheatley; (North Borneo) Narnin Singh ☠	Sikundong Kandurong; Pangeran Roup; Orang Kaya Awang

Units involved
British North Borneo Constabulary	Rebels

Casualties and losses
5x killed; 9x wounded	12x killed; 1.5x villages burnt

The Kawang Amok, also known as the Kawang Ambush, was an armed conflict that occurred on 12 May 1885 in the village of Kawang, North Borneo (present day Sabah), during the Kandurong Uprising. It was fought between members of the British North Borneo Constabulary and Bruneian rebels hired by the Taga'has tribe of the Murut.

== Background ==
The 1884 Tagahas–Liwan War, fought between the Taga'has and Liwan tribes in Pogunon, was bloody and devastating on both sides. It was fought to determine who would control the Salt Trail across the Crocker Mountains, and the rights to sell market goods at the tamu at Pogunon. This was most likely the first time that the trail had been a source of conflict since the 18th Century, when Aki Sogunting oversaw the Planting of the Stone.

Out of this war rose to prominence a man named Skundong Kandurong, Chief Headman (similar to a high king) of the Taga'has tribe, a title gained through his father. Through "force of character and ferocity," Kandurong maintained his power, and led his people to hunt down and kill the Liwan wherever possible in what became a war of reciprocity. They made peace, however, and the Salt Trail was at peace once again.

The North Borneo Chartered Company, which had only been established in 1881, was now trying to impose new taxes on those same goods his tribe had fought so hard to monopolise. Kandurong reached-out to another man named Pangeran Roup, a resident of the Sultanate of Brunei, and they began planning a rebellion against Chartered Company rule in their territory.

== Expedition ==
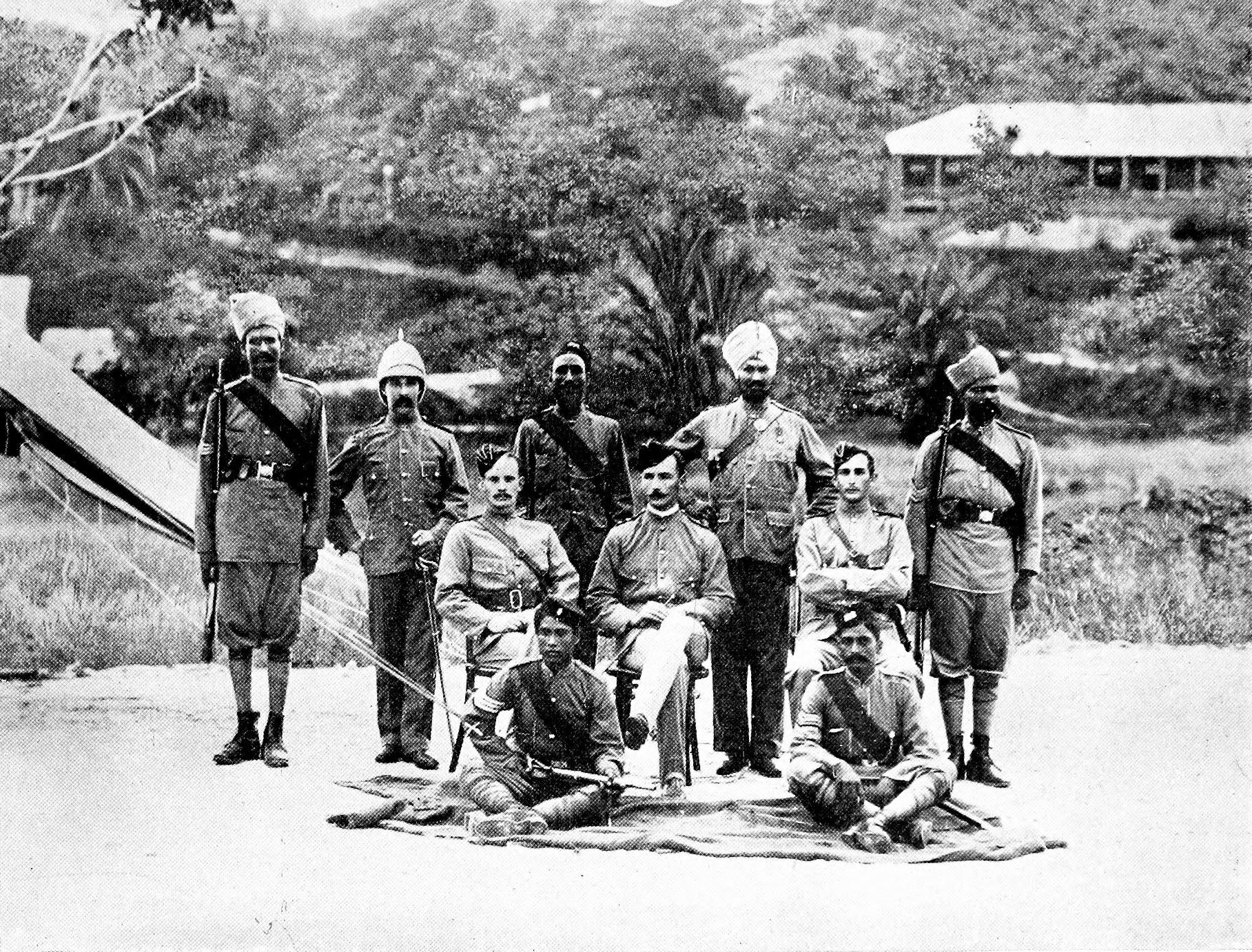
The British North Borneo Constabulary served a dual function as the military and police force of British North Borneo.

In 1885, two years after the Puroh Expedition, the Commandant of the British North Borneo Constabulary, Alexander Mortier de Fontaine, had received word that a notorious cattle rustler from the Crocker Range named Kandurong was hiding-out in the village of Kawang. To bring him to justice, he led a punitive expedition with a detachment of the Constabulary, arriving in the village on 10 May 1885. Joining De Fontaine at the head of the column were G. L. Davies, Dr. Manson Fraser, R. M. Little and J. E. G. Wheatley.

They had originally marched with a contingent of Bajau tribesmen, but a disagreement arose over the handling of baggage. Traditionally, Chinese men had been used as "baggage coolies," but there were not enough of them on this mission, and the Bajau considered the work beneath them. The British asked for an additional thirty men to handle the baggage, but the Bajau refused.

Later, Dusun baggage handlers arrived in the town, and accused the Bajau of riding one of their own stolen buffalo. They provided evidence to the Resident, who punished the thieves. By 12 May, the situation surrounding the shortage of baggage handlers had not been resolved, and it was decided to terminate the mission until more could be found.

== Ambush ==
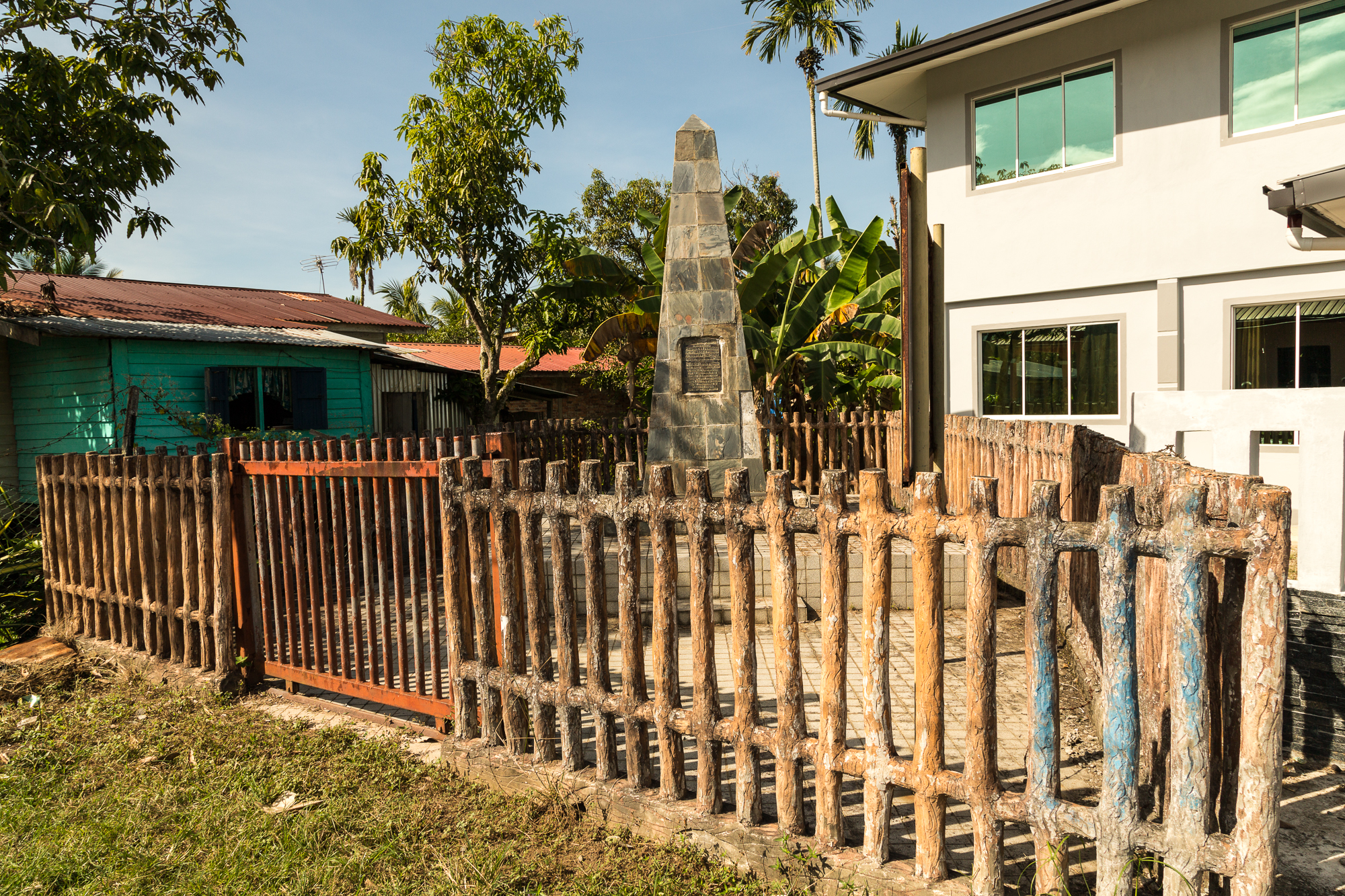
The De Fontaine Memorial was erected to memoiralise the Company employees who lost their lives at Kawang

Later that day, 12 May 1885, after the police were dismissed for the day, several members of the Constabulary were chatting in a group under a tree. Two Bajau men walked up to the group and entered into the conversation. One of these men pulled a gun and shot Dr. Fraser in the face.

It was later determined that this was a premeditated ambush, and that the leader of this group was a cattle rustler and native of Kinarut named Orang Kawa Awang, an agent of Pangeran Roup. Later intelligence revealed that he was most likely following orders from a larger organisation somewhere in Brunei.

A battle ensued between the Bajau and the Constabulary. At the end of the battle, around a dozen Bajau were killed. From the Constabulary, Commandant A. M. de Fontaine, Dr. Fraser, Jemadhar Esa Singh, Sergeant Major Narnin Singh, and Private Ganda Singh were all killed.

The expedition against Kandurong was postponed until 1888, when a new expedition was launched under Commandant R. D. Beeston, J. E. G. Wheatley and J. G. G. Wheatley.
