= East-the-Water Cemetery, Bideford =

Burial ground in Devon, England

Coordinates: 51.0203°N 4.1971°W

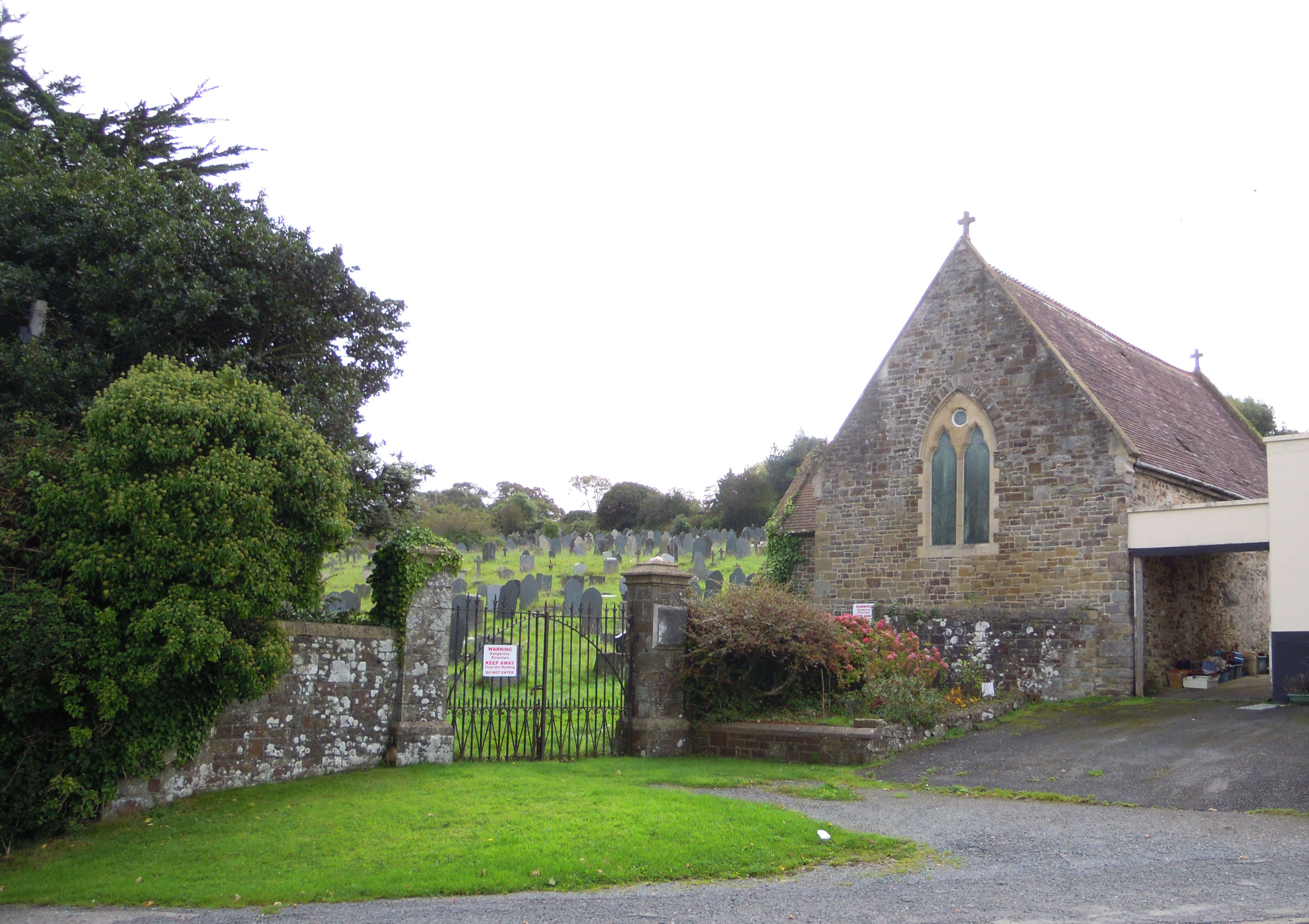
The entrance gates on Barnstaple Street with the chapel to the right

East-the-Water Cemetery (also known as Bideford Church Cemetery) was the Church of England burial ground for East-the-Water, once a separate village but now a suburb of Bideford, in Devon, England. Located on Barnstaple Road, the cemetery as of 2018 is abandoned and neglected, and the Victorian cemetery chapel is a dangerous structure on the verge of collapse. Burials in Bideford now take place at Bideford Higher Cemetery.

The cemetery and associated chapel were consecrated on 1st July 1890 on land donated by Sir George Stucley, who also donated a wheeled hand-bier for the poor. The cemetery contains 476 graves holding 947 people. Among these are 20 Commonwealth War Graves Commission burials, 7 from World War I and 13 from World War II, with their distinctive headstones.

== Notable burials ==
Buried at the back of the cemetery in adjacent plots are two recipients of the Victoria Cross:

- General George Channer (1843–1905)
- Lieutenant General Sir Gerald Graham (1831–1899)
- Lady Stuckley wife of Sir Hugh Nicholas Granville Stucley

== Gallery ==
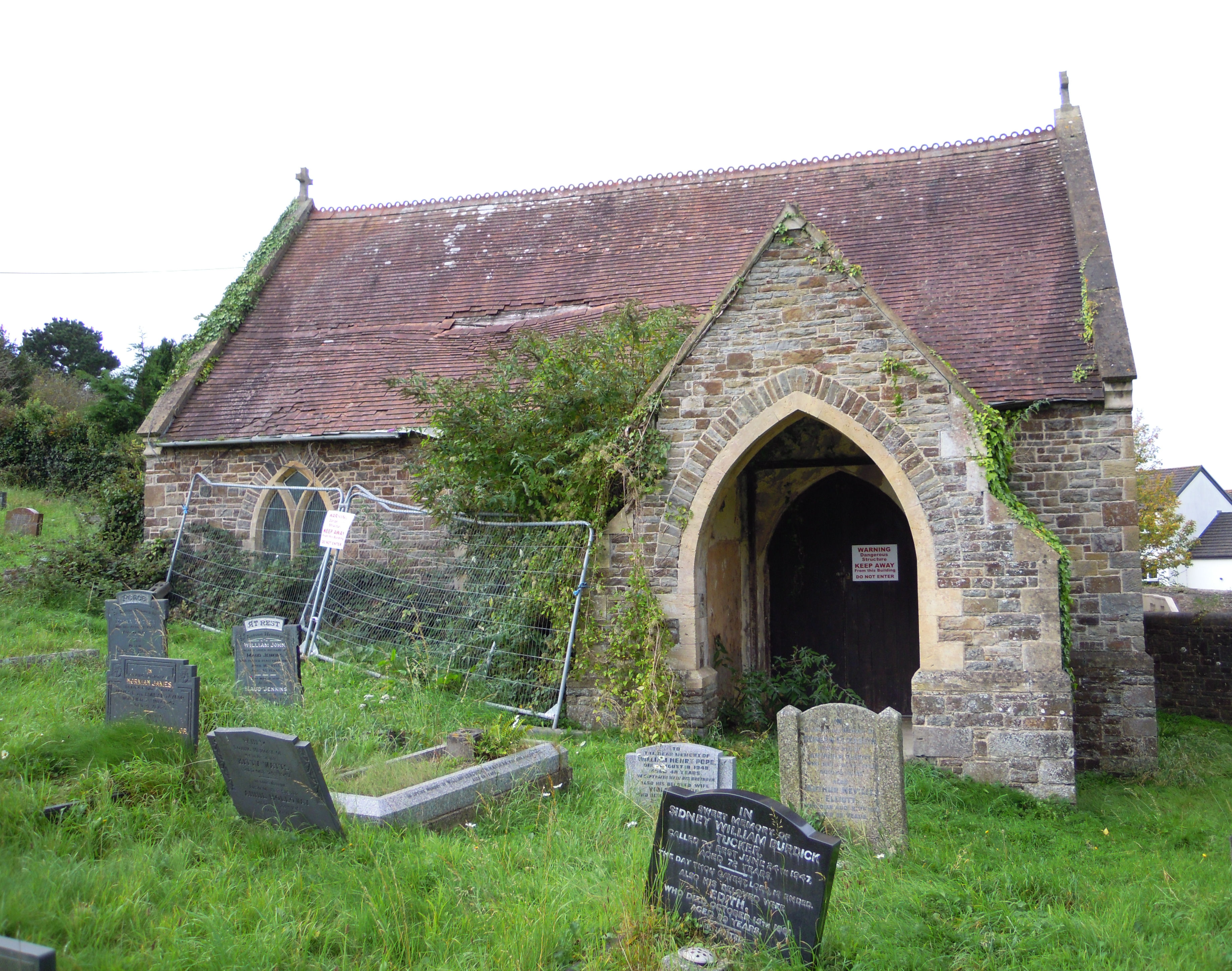
The derelict chapel

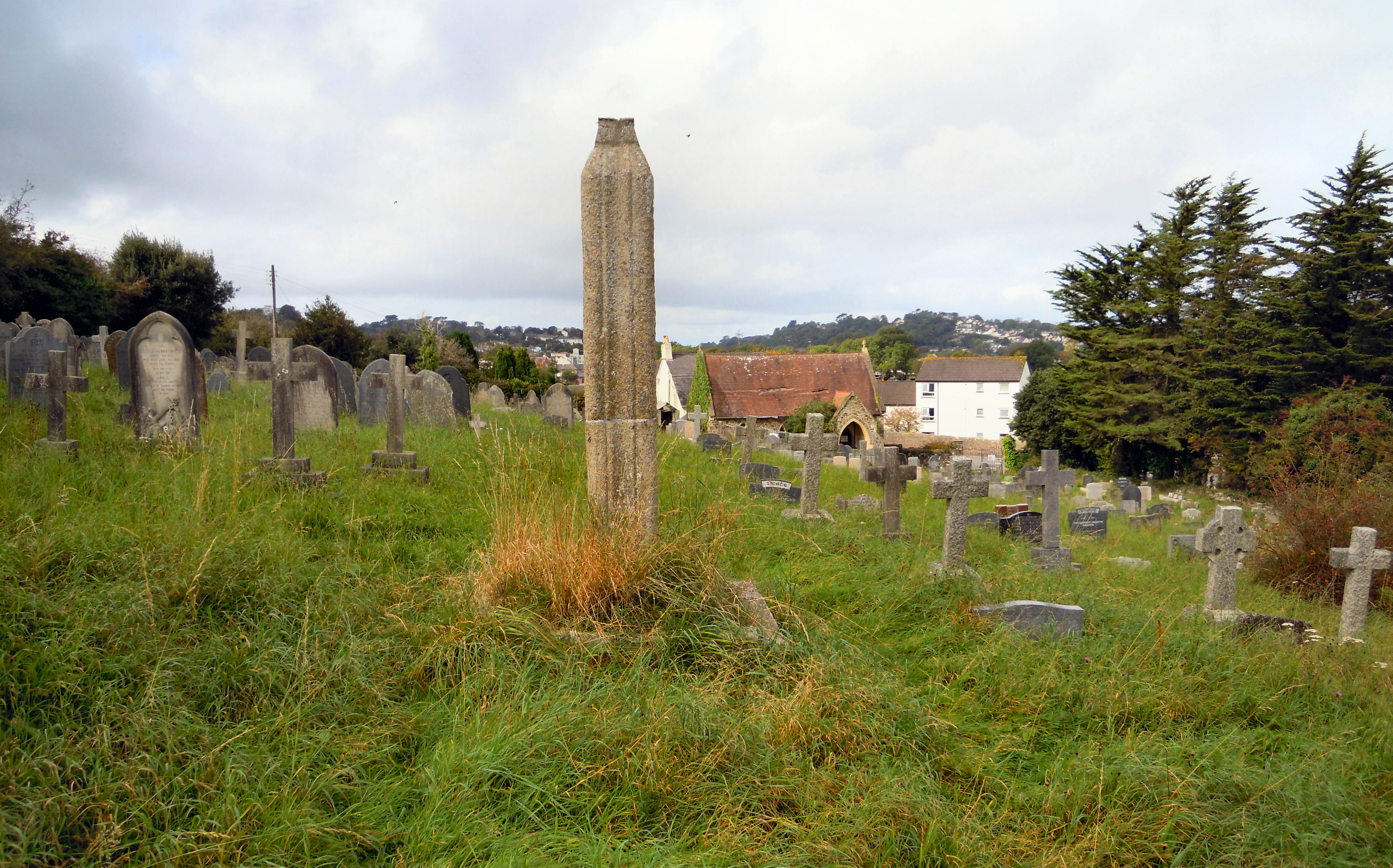
The remains of a monumental cross in the centre of the cemetery

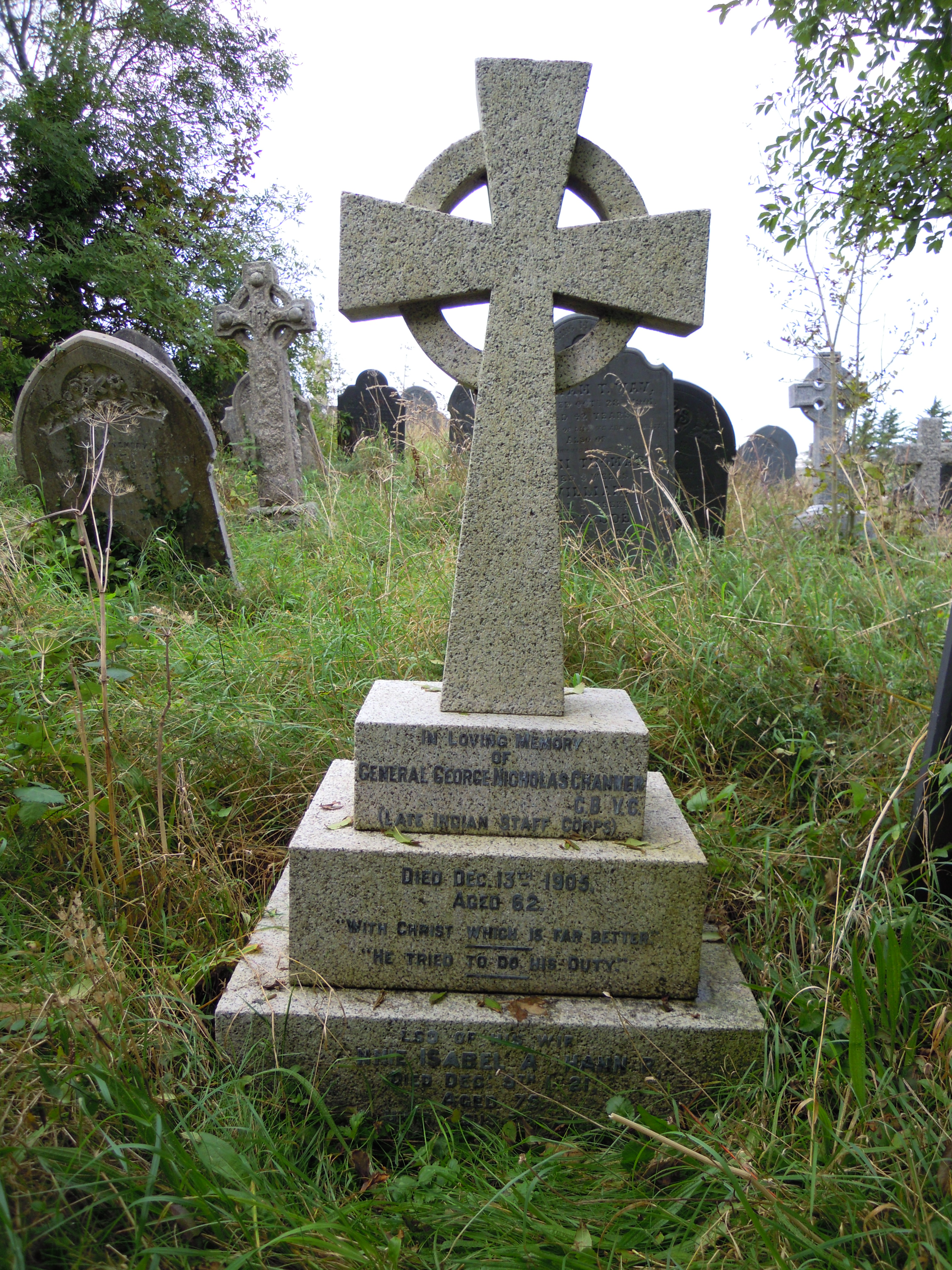
The grave of General George Channer in the cemetery

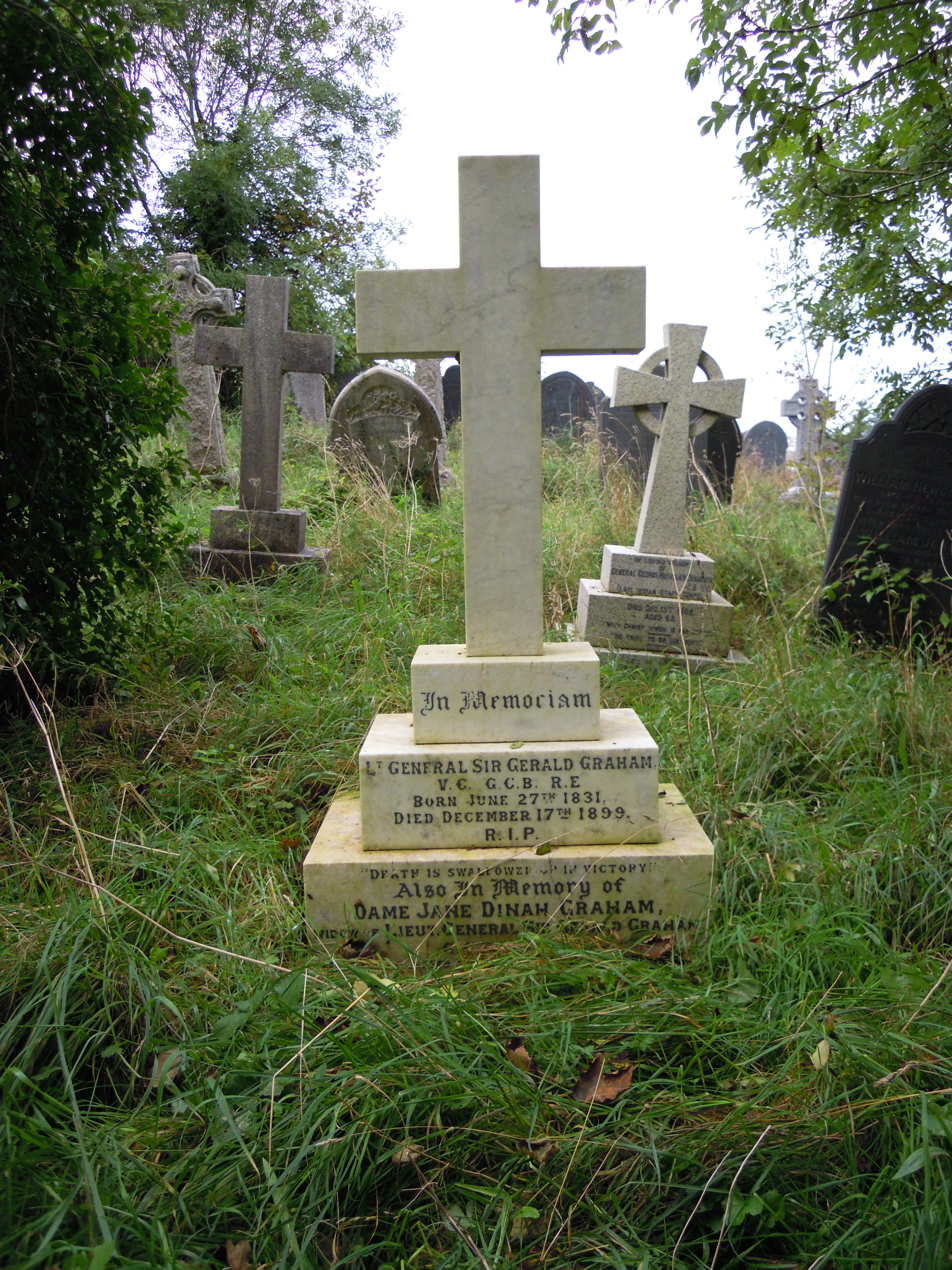
The grave of Lt. General Sir Gerald Graham

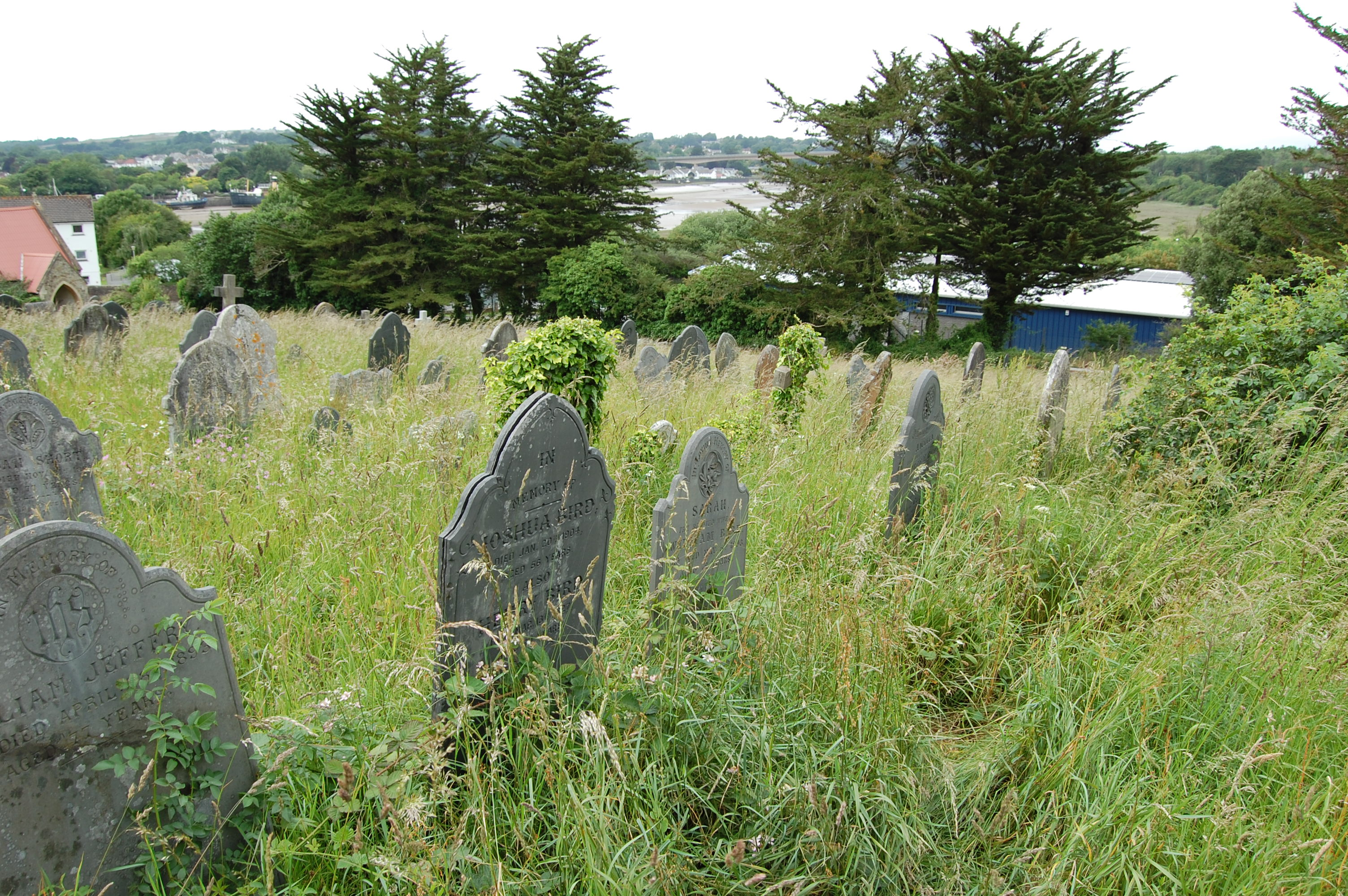
Overgrown section of the cemetery
