= Robert McEwen Little =

Government administrator in North Borneo (1860–1905)

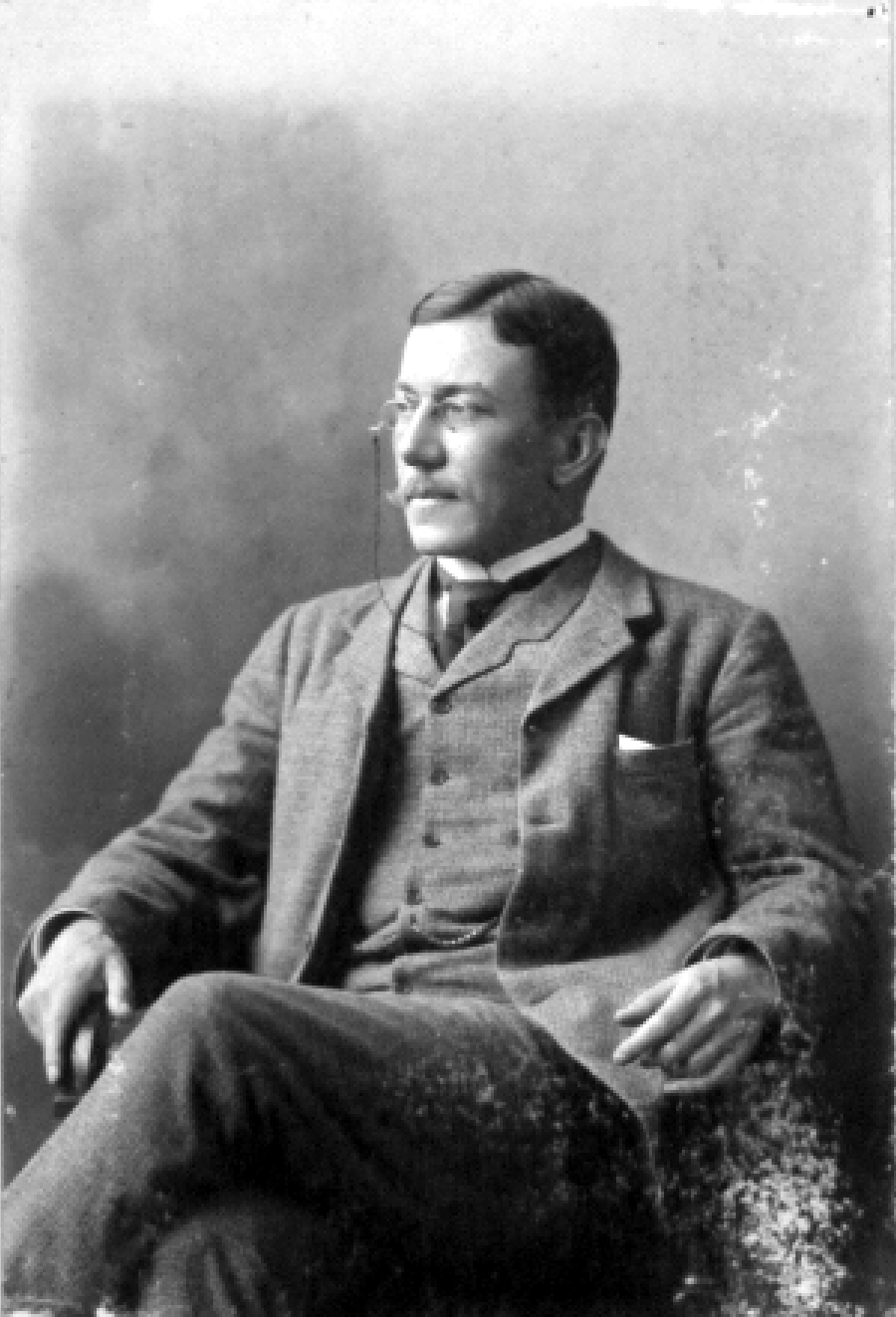
- A portrait of R. M. Little by William Crooke

Resident of Province Alcock
- In office 1902–1905

Deputy Governor of Crown Colony of Labuan
- In office 1899–1902

Resident of West Coast Residency
- In office 1892–1898
- Appointed by: Governor of North Borneo

Personal details
- Born: 16 October 1860 British Singapore, Straits Settlements
- Died: 17 December 1905 (aged 45) Edinburgh, Scotland, United Kingdom
- Children: Robert McEwen Little Jr.
- Cause of death: Pneumonia and pleurisy

Military service
- Branch/service: North Borneo Civil Service
- Battles/wars: Kandurong War; Puroh Expedition; Kawang Amok; Sigunting War; Mat Salleh Rebellion

Robert McEwen Little was a government administrator in North Borneo (present day Sabah) for the North Borneo Chartered Company.

== Biography ==
R. M. Little was born in British Singapore in 1860, the son of a doctor in the city there.

In Sandakan on 14 February 1883, Little entered into the Cadet Service of North Borneo as a Treasury Clerk. After several months, he was appointed as the Cadet-in-Charge of the Gaya-Papar District.

=== Puroh Expedition ===
When the first major inland expedition of the British North Borneo Constabulary – known as the Puroh Expedition – was undertaken by Alexander Mortier de Fontaine against the uprising force in the villages of Puroh and Gana, Little joined the expedition with G. L. Davies.

In January 1884, Little graduated from the Cadet Service and entered into the Civil Service of North Borneo, becoming Magistrate for Province Keppel and the Assistant Resident for the West Coast Residency. He spent the remainder of the decade as an Assistant Resident stationed throughout North Borneo, at Darvel Bay and Province Dent.

=== Kawang Amok ===
In May 1885, while serving as the Assistant Resident for the West Coast Residency, Little joined De Fontaine and the Constabulary on another expedition in the pursuit of an indigenous rebel leader named Kandurong. Their expedition arrived in the village of Kawang, where they were stopped due to a labour dispute with their Bajau baggage carriers. After the baggage carriers left for the day, several rebel leaders arrived and ambushed the expedition.

One of the men walked up to Dr. Mason Fraser while he was in a conversation and shot him in the head. The ambush continued, and Little was stabbed in the arm with a spear, but he was able to fight off his attackers with a revolver. Commandant De Fontaine was stabbed nine times with spears, got up from the ground and shot three men, but fell over again. De Fontaine later died of his wounds. Little survived the attack.

In the summer of 1887, Little made an ascent of Mount Kinabalu, the highest mountain in North Borneo (today the highest mountain in all of Malaysia). The reason for his journey, though, was to receive the surrender and submission of several local tribes that had recently rebelled against the government through the Planting of the Stone.

In May 1891, he was appointed Acting Resident of the West Coast Residency, and in February 1892 he was appointed Resident of the West Coast Residency.

=== Sigunting War ===
In June 1894, while stationed in the Marudu Hills, a rebel leader named Si Gunting brought a force of rebels and attacked his outpost. Little survived the attack.

=== Mat Salleh Rebellion ===
In June 1896, Little went up the Labuk River and the Sugut River with A. R. Dunlop and William Raffles Flint in the pursuit of Mat Salleh, the most wanted rebel leader in North Borneo since the country's creation in 1881.

==== Sandakan Durbar ====
On 28 May 1889, while celebrating the 70th birthday of Queen Victoria, there was a Durbar at Sandakan, bringing together the chiefs of all the local tribes in the region for a court and celebrations. There were also sporting activities. A rebel leader named Drah brought out a Parang and attacked Little. Little was cut on the head and cheek. Drah then attacked and wounded two constables, before the Sergeant Major of the local battery knocked him down and placed him in handcuffs. Little survived the attack. Dragh was later sentenced to 28 years with hard labour.

In 1890, Little went to England to rest and recuperate from his wounds, where he was mostly confined to his home there.

In October 1897, Little was hearing a case in the courthouse at Kudat when an earthquake stuck and the building had to be evacuated.

In 1897, Little married his stepmother's niece through an arranged marriage.

In 1898, Little moved to Labuan where he was appointed Resident. While in Labuan, on 23 September 1898, his wife gave birth to a son. The year after, Little was made Deputy Governor of Labuan, and was made one of three Commissioners for North Borneo.

==== Gaya Island Attack ====
In 1899, Mat Salleh launched an attack on Gaya Island. Little joined the expedition against Salleh there.

In 1902, he was appointed the Resident of Province Alcock at Kudat.

In 1903, Little joined A. B. C. Francis and Buchanan Smith in the pursuit of Si Ongga, the rebel leader who murdered George Graham Warder, the District Officer of Tindang Batu, at Marak Parak.

In 1904, Little arrested Li Min. Li Min was released from prison later that year when the charges were dropped after a campaign by the Straits Echo, the Straits Times and the Straits Budget.

=== Return to England and death ===
Little was appointed a Judge of the High Court in August 1904. In March 1905, he requested leave and sailed aboard steamship to the UK. He died the same year of pneumonia and pleurisy in Edinburgh.

== Written works ==
- Report on a Journey from Tuaran to Kian, province Keppel, and ascent of Kinabalu mountain, Borneo, Published in The Scottish Geographical Magazine, 1887
