= Puroh Expedition =

1883 punitive expedition in North Borneo

- Part of Kandurong War
- Type: Punitive Expedition
- Location: Puroh, Kimanis District, North Borneo
- Commanded by: (North Borneo) A. M. de Fontaine; (North Borneo) R. M. Little; (North Borneo) G. L. Davies
- Date: 1883
- Executed by: British North Borneo Constabulary
- Outcome: 12x villagers arrested; Rebel leader escaped; Village burned

The Puroh Expedition was the first armed expedition of the British North Borneo Constabulary against a local uprising force, following the murder of a Bruneian trader in the village of Puroh. While no firefight occurred, and only a single village was burned, it is notable as the Constabulary's first major punitive expedition.

== History ==
=== Background ===
In 1881, North Borneo was established under the North Borneo Chartered Company. That same year, they created the British North Borneo Constabulary to act as the new country's military and police force.

In 1883, at the village of Puroh, in the hills above the source of the Kimanis River, a trader from Brunei was murdered. There were several tribal members suspected to have been involved in the murder, but the Company-appointed tribal Headman refused to transfer these suspects to the government.

It was later revealed that the Headman of Puroh had actually ordered the killings on behalf of Kandurong, leader of the Tega'has tribe.

=== Expedition ===
To capture and prosecute the suspects, an expeditionary force of the Constabulary was mustered. This force comprised 26 Sikh constables, 18 Dyak and Malay constables, and their officers. The force was commanded by the Commandant of the British North Borneo Constabulary, Alexander Mortier de Fontaine. Also on this expedition were the Assistant Residents of Gaya and Papar; Robert McEwen Little and G. L. Davies.

They set out from Kimanis on 14 October 1883. Along the march, they ascended over 4,200 feet, descending the same on the other side. They were low on food and supplies. The road was rough underfoot, and several bamboo Sudah traps had been laid by the rebels. Their camps were set up in rough areas, and they had to contend with river leeches and jungle mosquitoes. It took them four days to march through the jungle over the Crocker Range and into the Limbawan Plain.

At the Limbawan Plain, the expedition gathered more members from the tribes living nearby, who were willing to fight against Kandurong and the villagers at Puroh. They rested at the Limbawan Plain for two days, retrofit with their new supplies and soldiers from the local tribes. They set out again, and reached Puroh on 20 October. The village, however, was mostly deserted.

Owen Rutter writes that the force did manage to capture 12 men taken as prisoner. Ian Black, however, writes that only 4 men were taken as prisoner. Two of these men were arrested as suspects in the initial murder of the trader, including the tribal Headman's uncle. After the arrests were made, the Constabulary handed-over jurisdiction of the village to the Limbawan tribes. On the order of the Residents, the Limbawan looted and burned the village to the ground.

The expedition returned to Kimanis on 28 October.
