= Alexander Mortier de Fontaine =

French adventurer, soldier, and policeman (1838–1885)

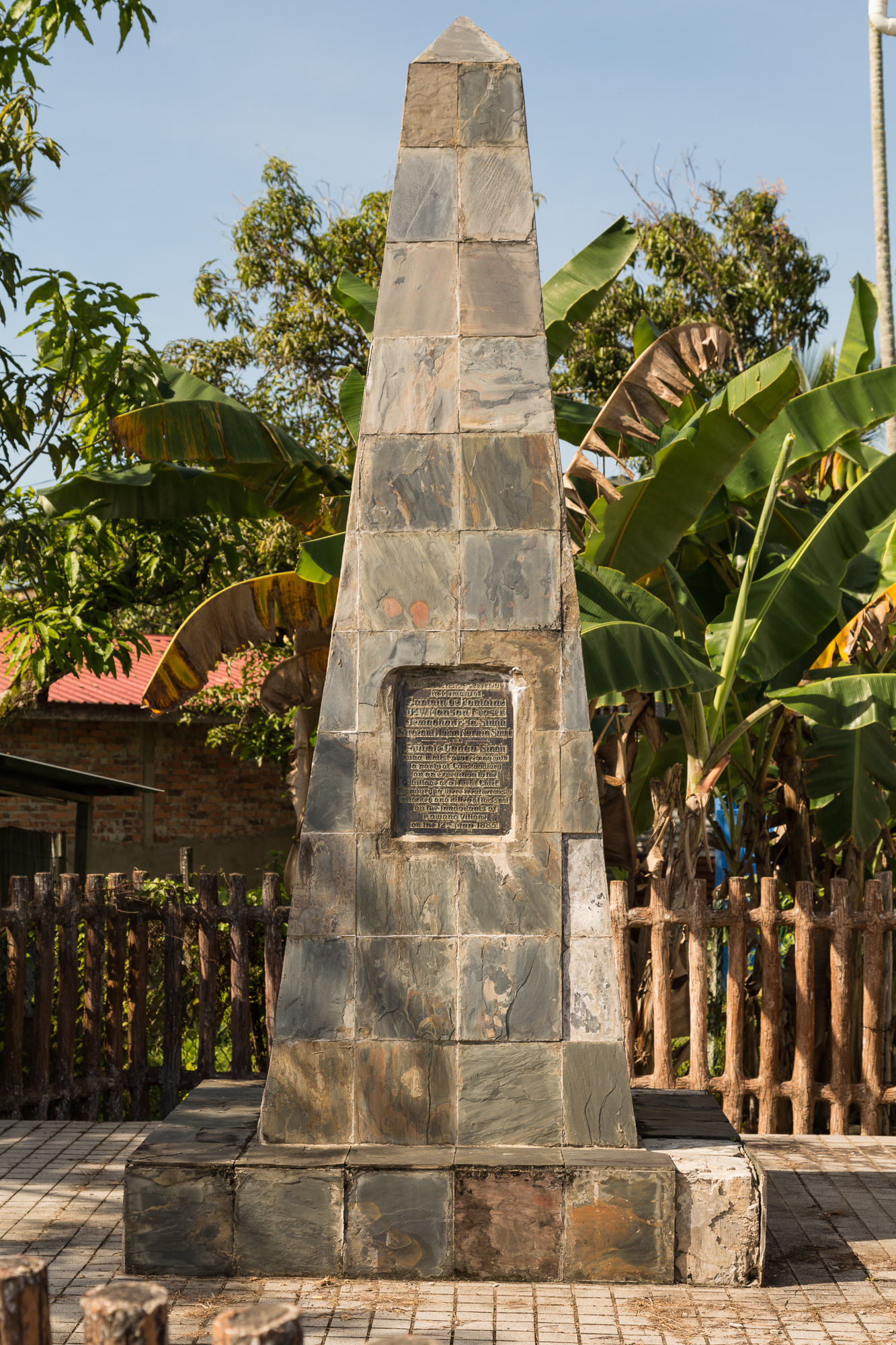
- De Fontaine Memorial in Sabah.

Commander of the Straits Settlements Native Auxiliary Force
- In office 1869–1876

2nd Commandant of the British North Borneo Constabulary
- In office 7 June 1883 – 17 May 1885
- Preceded by: Arthur Montgomery Harington
- Succeeded by: William Raffles Flint; John Smith

Personal details
- Born: 1838 Paris, France
- Died: 17 May 1885 (aged 46–47) Kawang, Western Residency, British North Borneo
- Resting place: European Cemetery, Sandakan
- Spouse: Johanna Bodestyne (m. 1864–1885)
- Children: Alexander Mortier de Fontaine; Louis Mortier de Fontaine; Percy Mortier de Fontaine
- Awards: Crimea Medal; India General Service Medal (1854)

Military service
- Branch/service: (France) French Navy; United States Army; United States Navy; Straits Settlements Police; Selangor Army; (United Kingdom) 10th Regiment of Foot; (Straits Settlements) Singapore Police Force; British North Borneo Constabulary
- Rank: Captain
- Battles/wars: Crimean War; Siege of Sevastopol; United States Civil War; Peninsula Campaign; Klang War; Siege of Klang City; Battle of Klang; Perak War; Sungai Ujong War; Battle of Paroi; Battle of Bukit Putus; Puroh Expedition; Kawang Amok †

Alexander Mortier de Fontaine (1838-1885), sometimes known as Alexander Fountain, was a French sailor who served as the Commander of the Native Auxiliary Force of the Straits Settlements Police Force, which gained a reputation for fearlessness and ferocity during the Klang War. After Klang was recaptured, he took a contingent of 85 of the Auxiliary with him to Sungei Ujong, known as De Fontaine's Arabs. Because he had served for several militaries by the time of his first major command, he was often called a mercenary, an adventurer, a drifter, and an aimless wanderer. After these major campaigns, he became an inspector in Singapore for nearly a decade, before becoming the 2nd-serving Commandant of the British North Borneo Constabulary, where in 1885 he was killed during the Kawang Amok.

== Early life and military career ==
De Fontaine was born in Paris in 1838.

In 1854, when the Second French Empire officially entered into the Crimean War, he ran away from home to enlist in the French Navy. His service in Crimea earned him the Crimea Medal, where for roughly a year, he fought in the Siege of Sevastopol. He had a decent career in the French Navy, reaching the rank of Midshipman before the end of his contract.

In 1861, with the American Civil War looming, De Fontaine enlisted in the United States Army to fight for the Union against the cause of slavery, but he did so under an assumed identity. In a letter home to his mother, he told her: "Mother, you ask whether you might write me under my own name: don't do it, as they would become doubtful as to my real identity..." On 2 September 1864, resuming his identity, De Fontaine entered into the United States Navy at the recruitment center in Bangor, Maine. He served as a sailor for roughly a year during the war. Because some of his superiors didn't know how to pronounce his name, he often went by the name "Alexander Fountain." His American recruiter wrote his age as 21, and that he had a "dark" skin complexion.

== Relocation to the Straits Settlements ==
=== Involvement in formation of police force ===
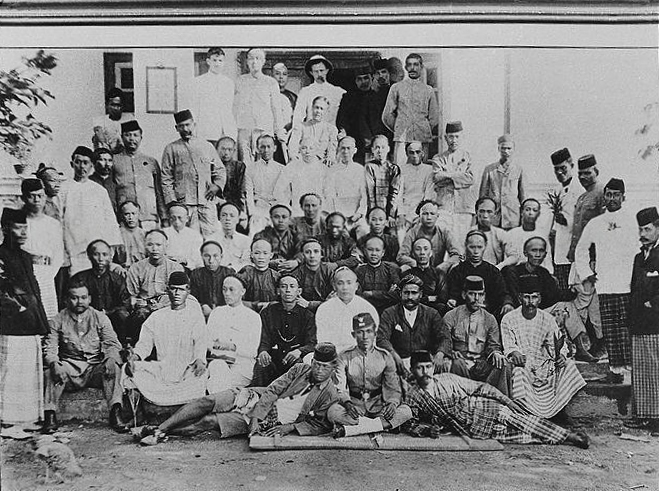
The Straits Settlements Police Force was established in 1867.

With the end of the Civil War, De Fontaine wound up migrating to Southeast Asia. At some point, he was shipwrecked for an unknown duration, and after being rescued, decided to switch careers.

In 1867, the Straits Settlements was made a Crown Colony, and the Straits Settlements Police Force was established to oversee the police forces of the Settlements, with its headquarters in British Singapore. Around this time, De Fontaine had moved to the city, becoming one of their first recruits. He served as a warder for the Straits Settlements Police Force, being placed into their subsidiary outfit, the Singapore Police Force (SPF).

In 1869, during the Klang War, Tengku Kudin of Selangor visited Singapore in search of money and men to fight with him in the Klang War, also making the acquaintance of James Guthrie Davidson, a local rich British man. Davidson raised the funds and alliances to purchase a steamship and 70 junkets which would act as the bulk of the Kudin Fleet. The fleet's object was to assault Kota Raja Mahadi, the fortress command of the Raja Mahadi at the mouth of the Klang River, which was now under siege by Rajah Ismail.

Kudin convinced the Commissioner of Police to raise for him a fighting unit. De Fontaine was tasked with building this Native Auxiliary Force, which was to be a rapidly-deployable force of soldiers for the pleasure of the Governor and the British Residents in the area. They would be able to respond to any emergency in the colonies at a moment's notice. This was to operate apart from the Singapore Volunteer Rifles Corps, which was an exclusively European unit.

The men that De Fontaine found as officers to lead this unit were "drifters who failed to get work in Singapore..." A Dutch man, a former British Army sergeant, and a failed Italian businessman. His 200 enlisted Sepoys were a "...vagabond group of desperadoes, thieves and opium smokers..." The first place he searched for men, naturally, was the jail where he was assigned as warder. He found "...Indian and Malay ruffians, and criminals recruited from Pinang, Malacca, and Singapore." They had not yet proven themselves on the battlefield, but they would soon obtain a reputation as some of the most furocious fighters that the Malay Peninsula had ever seen, described as exceptionally ruthless.

De Fontaine was a more non-traditional leader than most of the Colonial mindset in Southeast Asia. He especially did not enforce the expected methods of supposed "discipline" on his men (a euphemism to mean that he didn't flog them) and trusted their independence. For this, The Straits Times wrote: "This mob... is totally without discipline with the exception of a certain dim idea that where their commander leads they must follow... famed like their commander for deeds of valour... regarded by the Malay population as demons of the most unparalleled ferocity." They were also described as slovenly, but this meant that De Fontaine didn't spend his time on drills and ceremony or making sure that their uniforms were bristling and shiny. De Fontaine's men got results on the battlefield, and struck fear into the hearts of whoever they fought.

=== Involvement in the Klang War ===
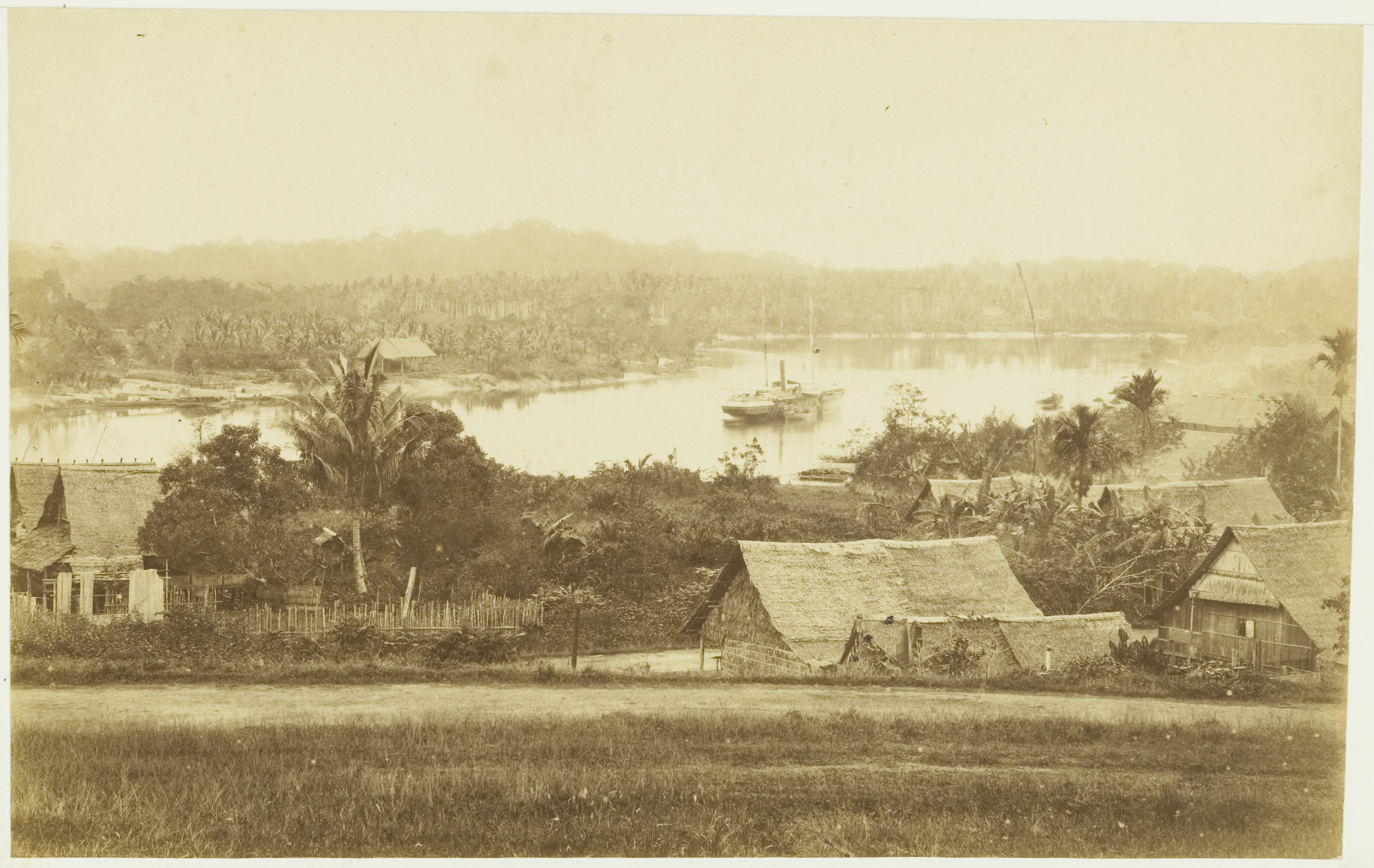
During the Klang War, Rajah Ismail placed the town of Klang under siege for 6 months, in what was known as the Battle of Klang. De Fontaine fought here with his men for 3 of those.

In October 1869, De Fontaine arrived with the fleet. Upon arriving, De Fontaine discovered that the Rajah Ismail's fleet had not yet been able to raise their canon shot high enough to hit the fort. De Fontaine knew that he needed to get above the fort to fire on it, but not having any portable canon for his own use, he jerry-rigged together an assemblage of improvised portable canon by mounting 18-pounder long guns and 18-pounder short guns to the decks of dinghies and other small boats. He then lashed rope to the bow of these small boats, and had his men hoist them up like skids to the tops of the hills overlooking the Mahdi's fortified positions at Kota Raja Mahadi. From there, his men began firing at Mahadi's positions daily. In March, 1870, after De Fontaine had been fighting here for three solid months, the siege was over, the Madhi had escaped, and Kudin was now victorious as the ruler of Klang. With Klang now at peace, instead of returning to Singapore, the Auxiliary Force remained garrisoned at Klang for several years with De Fontaine in command.

In 1873, when Kudin engaged in the second half of the Klang War, two of the officers under his old command, Van Hagen and Cavalieri, were killed along with their entire force of 100 Sepoys during their hasty retreat at the Battle of Kuala Lumpur. De Fotaine is not recorded in the roll of officers at this battle, and there is no evidence that he fought here.

Eighty years after the fact, in 1955, the Straits Times published an article stating that De Fontaine had "fled" from his command by March 1875, when Henry Charles Syers arrived at Klang to take over command of the Auxiliary Force, transforming its surviving 100 members into the newly established Selangor Police Force. However, this is incorrect. He did not "flee," rather, he had simply gone on paternity leave for the birth of his second son, Percival Mortier de Fontaine, OBE, who was born in 1875. The command of those Auxiliary forces stationed in Klang during 1875 was left with a man named Ali Mamat, a Mauritian, of whom many newspapers writing decades afterward would confuse with De Fontaine because they were working with the oral accounts of men who couldn't tell the difference between two Frenchmen.

=== Involvement in the Sungei Ujong War ===
==== Battle of Paroi ====
In December 1875, at the same time as the Perak War was raging along the Perak River, the Malacca Column of the 10th Regiment of Foot was marching into Sungei Ujong under the command of Lieutenant Colonel E. Bertie Clay of the Gurkhas to reinforce the British Resident Patrick James Murray in his fight against Tuanku Antah, the Yamtuan of Seri Menanti. For naval support they were assisted by Francis Stirling and the HMS Thistle.

De Fontaine was on a quick march from Singapore to join the Malacca Column with a contingent of 85 of the Native Auxiliary Force. These 85 men – even though they were a cosmopolitan mixture of diverse men from around the world; Seedies and Kroomen, Egyptian, Somali, Sikh, Punjabis, Malay, and others – within the Malacca Column, they had gained the name of the Arab Contingent, but mainly known as The Arabs or De Fontaine's Arabs.

De Fontaine's Arabs sailed from Singapore, landing at Malacca on 4 December. They marched overland to Lukut, and reached Seremban on 6 December 1875.

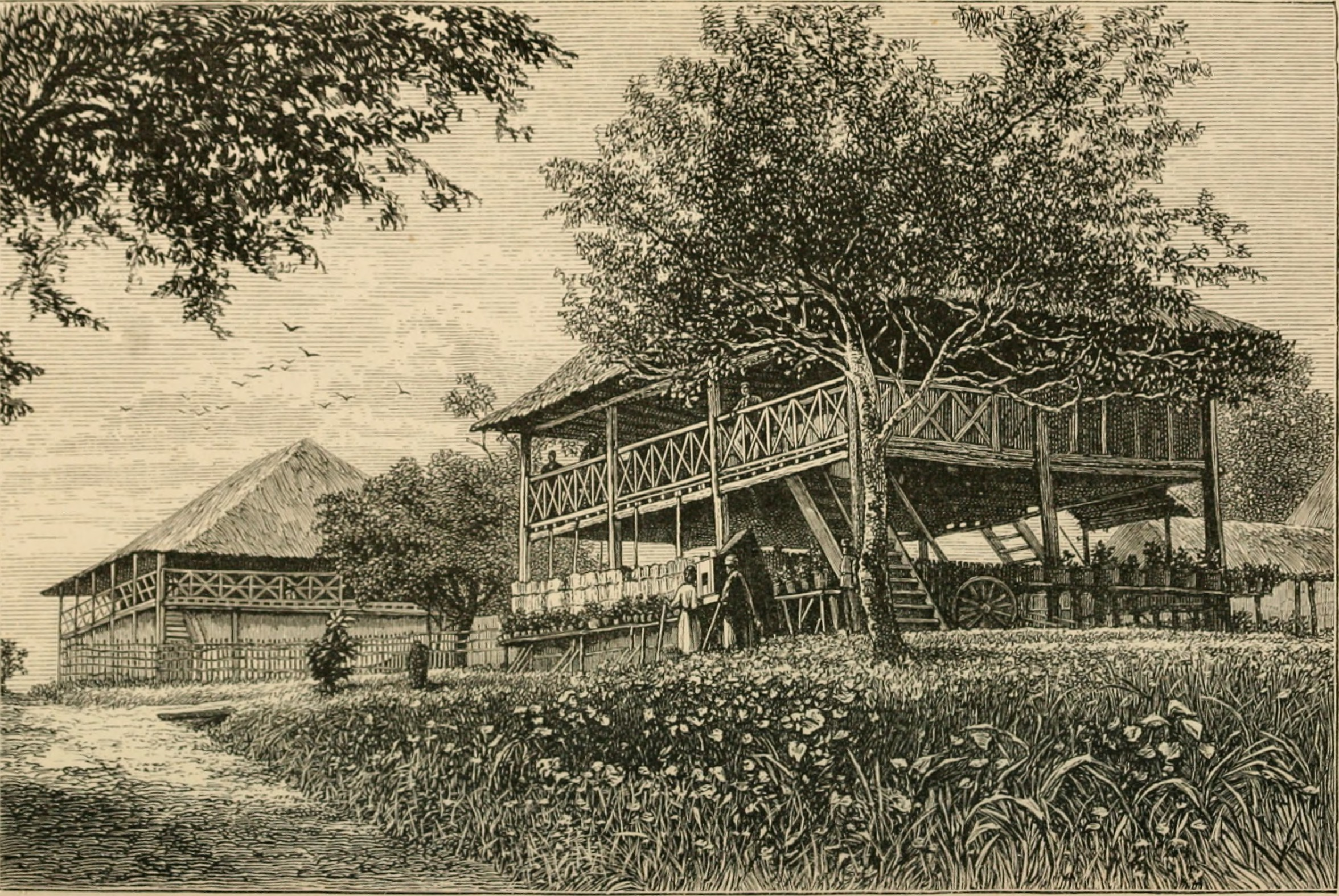
The police station at Rassa, a small village near Seremban.

On 6 December 1875, when De Fontaine's Arabs arrived at Rassa, their presence gave Resident Murray enough confidence to march against Paroi. The next day, on 7 December 1875, De Fontaine's Arabs set out with the 10th Regiment and Lieutenant Henry Charles Hinxman to assault the fortifications and stockades lining the Paroi River. The oppositional force of Malays gave heavy resistance and outnumbered the British assault.

One detachment of The Arabs broke off of the main assault to flank the Malays, but they were forced to retreat. For an hour, gunfire was exchanged across a swamp, with casualties on both sides. British artillery finally arrived, and began firing on the Malay army. Hinxman gave the order to fix bayonets and run for a final charge – at which point Paroi fell into British possession.

==== Battle of Bukit Putus ====
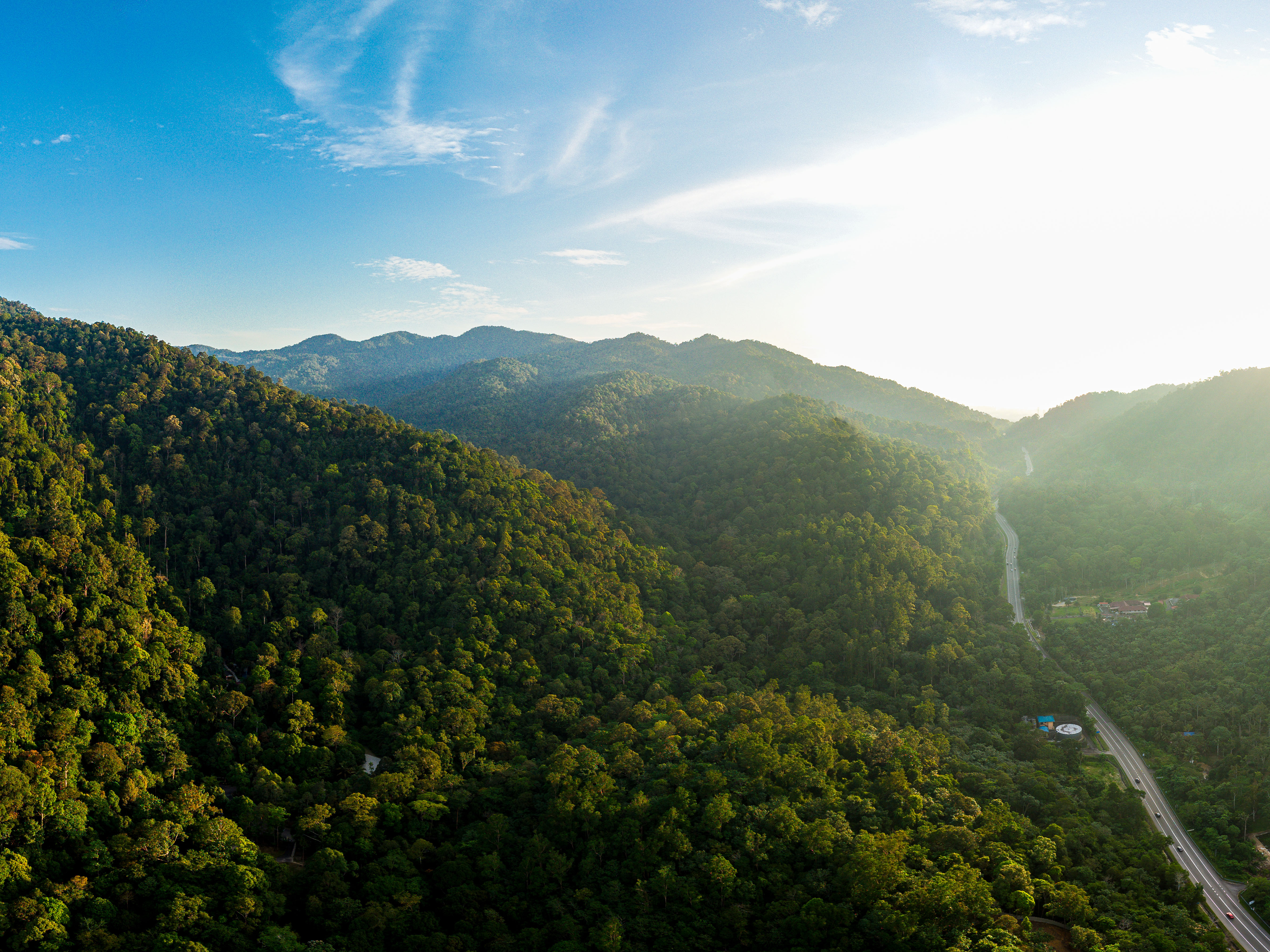
Bukit Putus was site of the major battle that won a Victoria Cross for George Channer, and made De Fontaine a social pariah within the British Empire.

With Paroi being in British possession, on 10 December, the army marched onto Antah's fortress at Bukit Putus (English: Hill of the Tiger's Tail). Murray's men marched to come around the rear, while the 10th Regiment, the Gurkhas, and De Fontaine's Arabs assaulted from the front. A recon patrol of the 1st Gurkha Rifles was led by George Channer, who led them under the cover of fire from De Fontaine's Arabs to one of the stockades. Channer then rushed the stockade, earning the Victoria Cross in the process.

With the Malays now on the retreat, the army moved northward to Terrache. De Fontaine's Arabs were the last to leave Bukut Putus. Colonel Clay passed down the order to De Fontaine: to burn everything as they marched to the north. They did so. De Fontaine's Arabs burned the stockades, they burned houses, fields, groves, and villages as they marched north. The regulars of the 10th Regiment were then reported going into houses and stealing anything they could find. Despite the fact that it was the regular British soldiers of the 10th Regiment that looted homes at Bukit Putus, and not De Fontaine's Arabs. However, many people, upon reading the stories in London automatically assumed it was De Fontaine's Arabs doing the looting. The Straits Times wrote:

"...Heaven knows what the London journals will say about it... they may view the matter as they did Commodore Sir William Hewett's raid upon pirates in Congo river, where there seems to have been still more looting and burning, respecting which, however, the London press for the most part preserved a discreet silence. There is nothing to be said for the order to the Arabs to burn and destroy, and the permission to the regulars to loot..."

Despite the fact that it was standard practice for British units in the 19th Century to burn villages, De Fontaine's Arabs became scapegoats in the London press, held up as an example for anti-colonial activists there. When news reached London of the events that had transpired, Lord Stanley of Alderley in the House of Lords objected to the burning. Later that year, he introduced a resolution to the Chamber that the House of Lords should lay the blame on the Colonial Department for their poor performance. The Earl of Carnarvon hotly debated the language of the resolution. The Straits Times, upon hearing that the Secretary of State had admonished De Fontaine and his second-in-command Robinson directly by name, stated that they could provide a much longer list of names who were more suitable for the vitriol of the government in London. Those who were on the ground continued to defend the honor of De Fontaine's Arabs. One letter written to The Straits Times said:

"In every affair in which they were engaged, from the taking of the Stockades at Paroa, to the return march of the whole force from Seri Menanti, I maintain that neither the charge of assination or theft can be laid more at their door than any other body of troops. They conducted themselves in a becoming manner, and such as troops fighting under the British Flag should do."

When the Perak War and the Sungei Ujong War had largely ceased, the Government offered De Fontaine's Arabs to return to Klang for the protection of James Guthrie Davidson, who was now the Resident there. Davidson refused, turning the men away.

=== Return to Singapore ===
On 28 May 1877, De Fontaine returned to active duty as an inspector for the Singapore Police Force. By 1878, De Fontaine was specifically recognized by the Chief Police Officer of the Straits Settlement Police Force for his "...zealous application to work and uniform good conduct..." He assisted in routine investigations, such as in 1881, following the case of a theft of bank notes, and later an authorized search of a dwelling. He also investigated missing persons, such as in 1881, the case of a missing man in Campong Battak – a man that when De Fontaine went enquiring after, found blood on the walls and the man's body buried in a shallow grave. On 5 April 1883, De Fontaine led a group of 12 men to raid a non-authorized opium farm shop called the "Spirit Farm Shop," in a seaside fishing town called Campong Pukat, and uncovered approximately $660 worth of processed opium.

== British North Borneo Constabulary ==
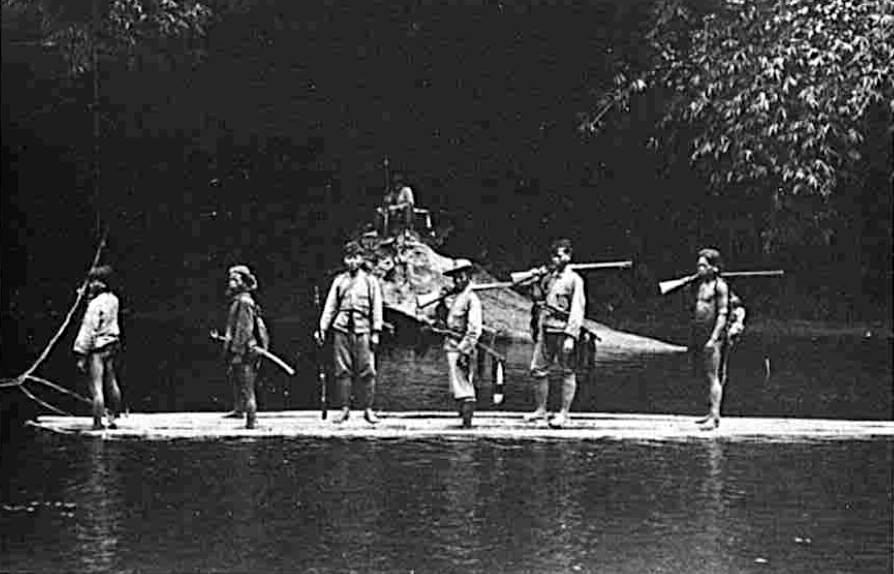
The British North Borneo Constabulary was the military and police force of North Borneo.

In 1881, the North Borneo Chartered Company was established as the governing authority over their newly established country of North Borneo, a country roughly the size of Northern Ireland at the Northeast tip of Borneo. The country's only police and military force was the British North Borneo Constabulary, whose first-serving Commandant was Arthur Montgomery Harington. "The Company," as it was known, did not have enough financial resources to pay for the total number of men that Harington desired for a professional police force.

When Harington resigned out of frustration with Company authorities over this in 1883, Governor Treacher arranged with Sir Hugh Low, the British Resident of Perak, to find someone qualified within the Straits Settlements that might be suitable enough to command the nascent Constabulary. Hugh Low suggested De Fontaine. De Fontaine resigned his commission in the Straits Settlements Police Force. He and his wife boarded a steamship moved to North Borneo, taking their four children with them. The move meant that they missed the 1883 eruption of Krakatoa by several months, which covered the city of Singapore in ash.

On 7 June 1883, shortly after arriving in the new country, De Fontaine was officially appointed as the 2nd Commandant of the Constabulary (equivalent in rank to a Chief of Police, but more closely related to a military General in function). When De Fontaine arrived at Kudat, which was very briefly the capital city of North Borneo, the Constabulary had six different types of uniforms and no standardized weaponry; the European officers had standard loadouts, but the native members of the constabulary had been told to make due.

De Fontaine, despite his reputation in earlier years, created here a professionalized military and police force. Almost as soon as his arrival, he rotated-out district police training on Fort Hill at Kudat. Nearly every day for several months, the residents of the town would hear the sounds of 12-pounder howitzers and Vavasseur breech-loading rifled six-pounders as the Constabulary was trained on their new systems.

=== Puroh Expedition ===
On 14 October 1883, De Fontaine led an expedition known as the Puroh Expedition, which was the first major inland expedition of the Constabulary against a local uprising force. Initially, they were engaged as a punitive mission to prosecute the murder of a Brunei trader in the village of Puroh. The expeditionary force was around 50 strong, accompanied by the Residents of Gaya and Papar and Sandakan, G. L. Davies and R. M. Little. They marched out from Kimanis on 14 October 1883, and took 4 days to march over the mountains, along the Kimanis River, and across the Limbawan Plain to reach Puroh.

The force was then joined by locals from the surrounding areas as they camped for two days. They arrived at the village of Puroh on 20 October and took twelve prisoners. The British commanders authorized the local Limbawan tribes to burn the village to the ground. The fugitives, however, had already fled the village by the time that the expedition arrived, and no major battle occurred.

=== Kawang Amok ===
De Fontaine died at the Kawang Amok.

== Legacy ==
He is remembered today by the De Fontaine Memorial.
