= Bideford Higher Cemetery =

Cemetery in north Devon, England

Coordinates: 51°00′35″N 4°13′19″W

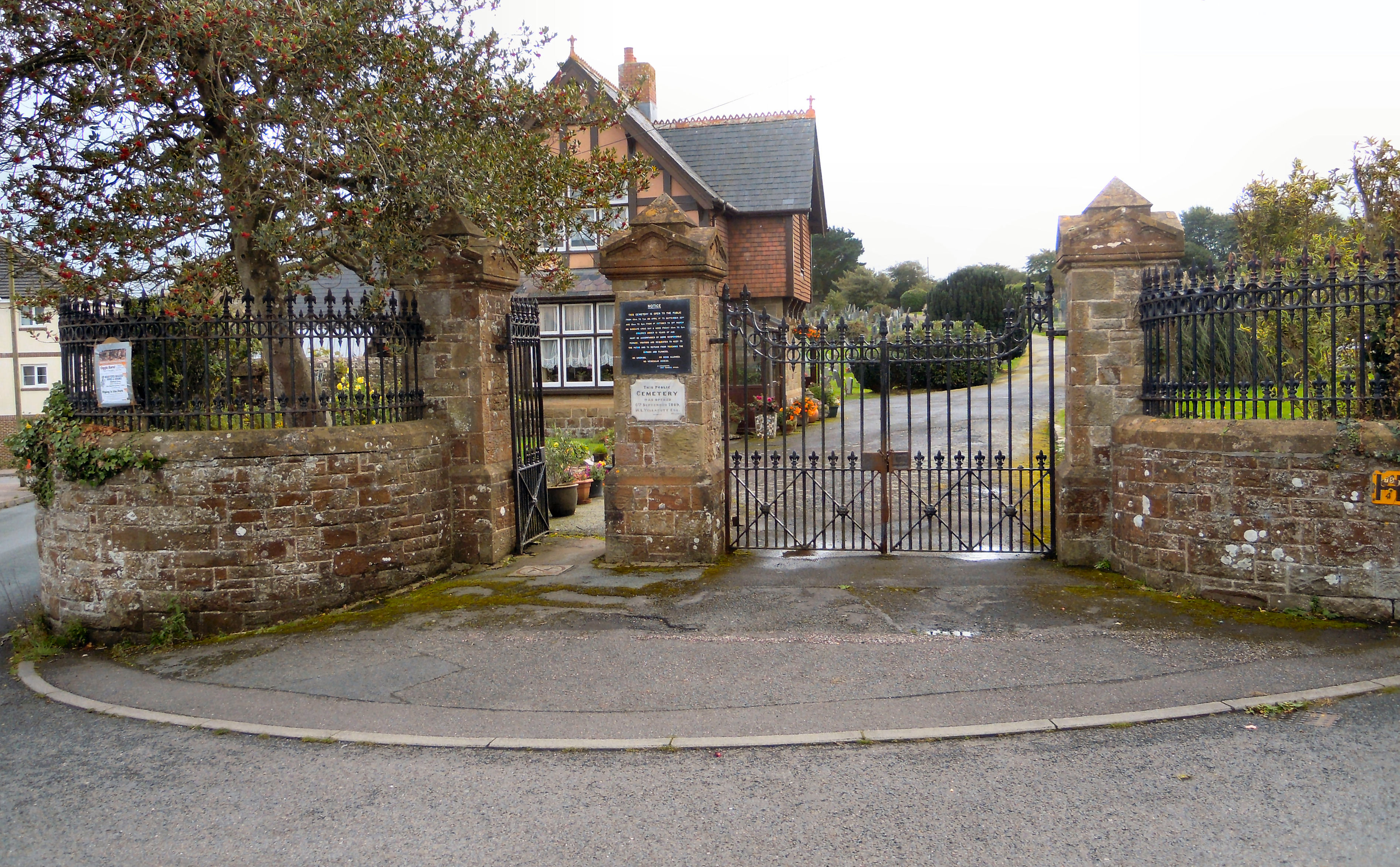
The entrance to Bideford Higher Cemetery

Bideford Higher Cemetery is the burial ground for Bideford in North Devon. Today it is managed by Torridge District Council.

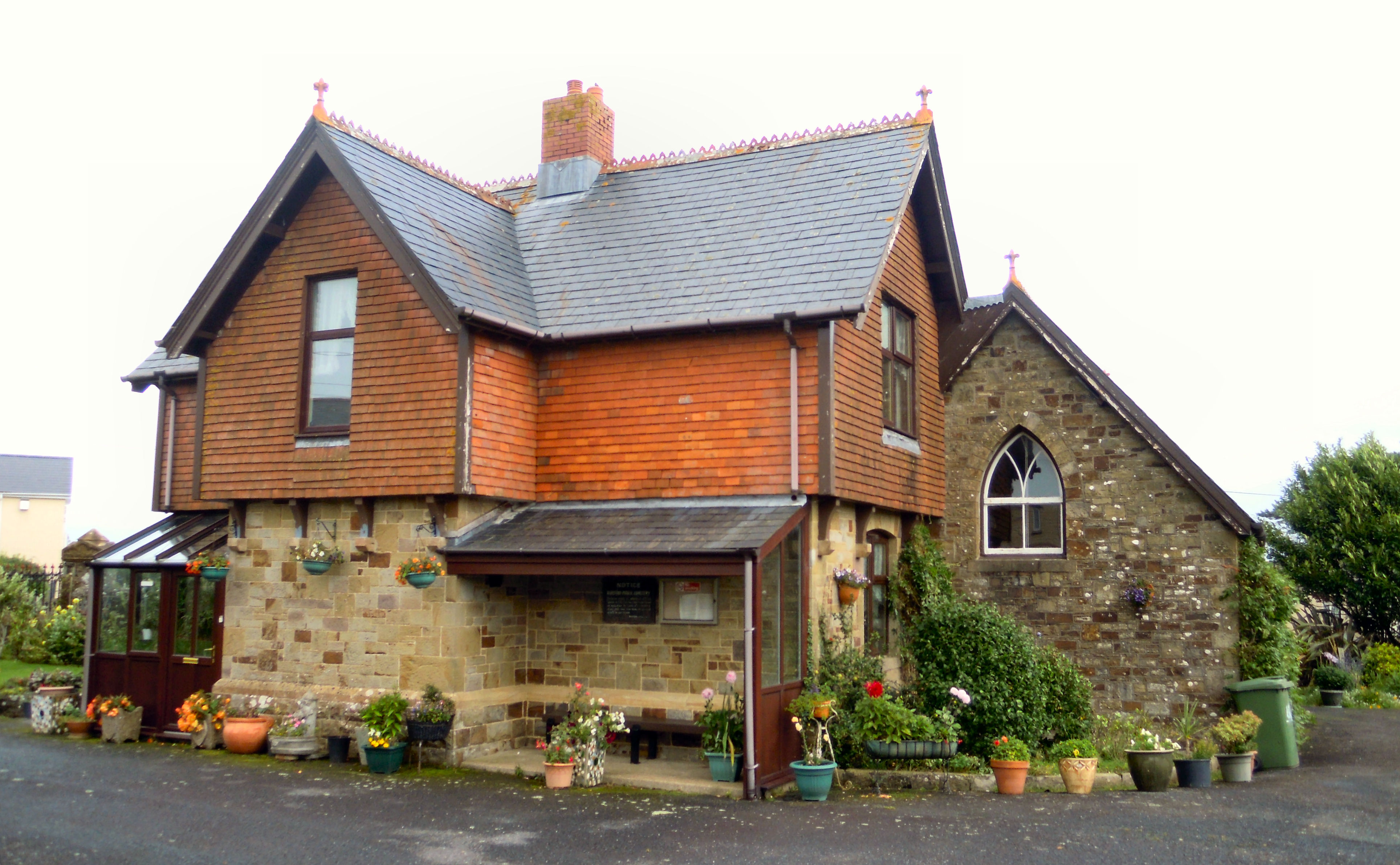
The caretaker's cottage in the cemetery

The cemetery was opened on Buckland Road in Bideford by W.L. Yellacott, the Mayor of Bideford, on 6 September 1889. The cemetery's records from 1899 to 1966 are held in the North Devon Athenaeum, a private library which shares the top floor of the Barnstaple Library building. The cemetery has 13 burials from World War I and World War II with their distinctive Commonwealth War Graves Commission headstones.

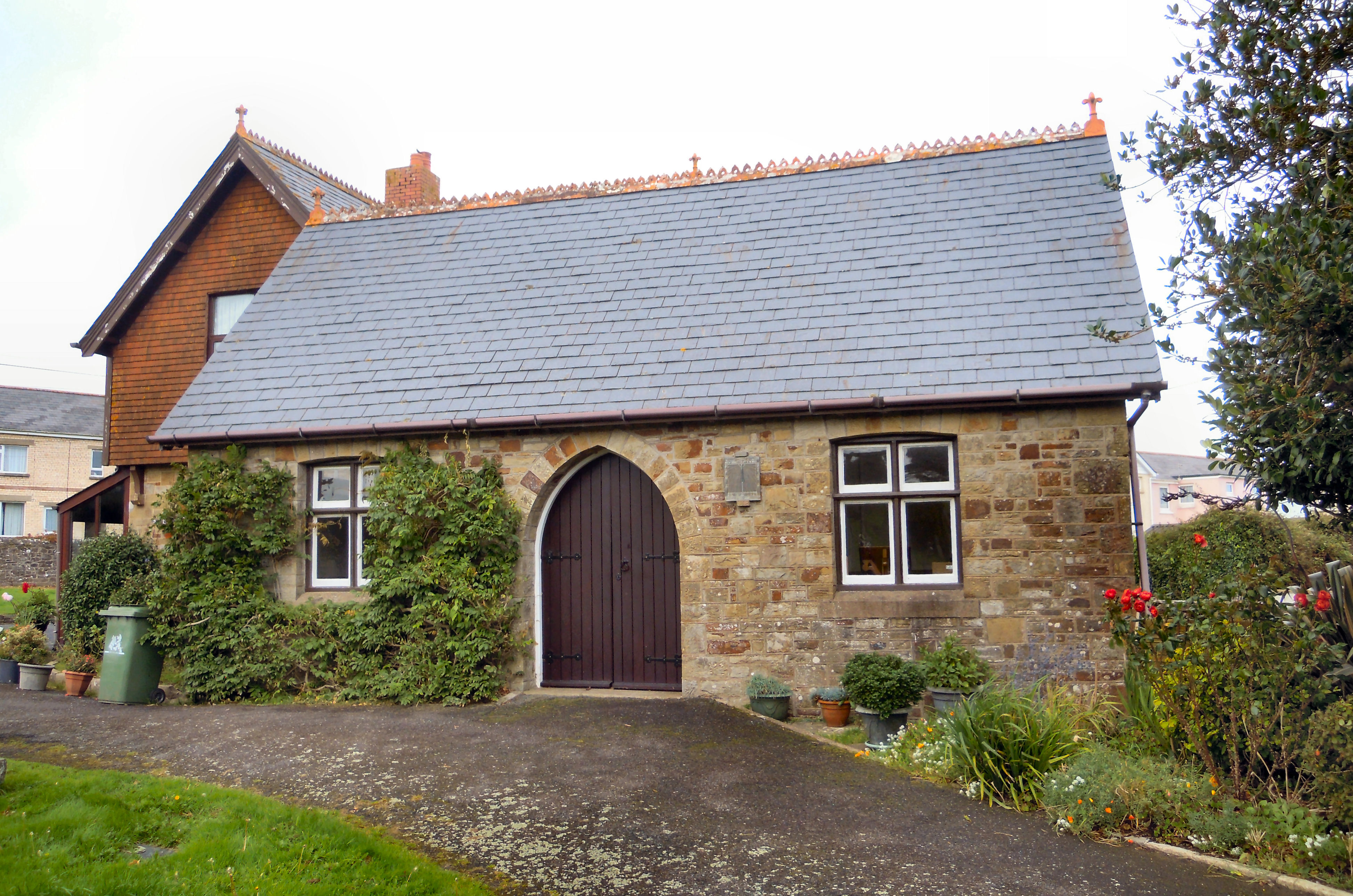
The cemetery chapel

Buried here are 20-year-old Pilot Officer Philip Henry Lowther RAF (1922–1942) who was killed in a flying accident when the Bristol Blenheim he was flying crashed into a pylon at Stoke Holy Cross in Norfolk during an air test in 1942. Also buried here is Crimean War veteran Sergeant Major William Rogers (1823–1897) of the 21st Royal Scots Fusiliers who was awarded the Distinguished Conduct Medal in 1855. He ended his days as a Chelsea Pensioner at the Royal Hospital Chelsea. Buried beside him is his son the historian and geologist Inkerman Rogers FGS (1866–1959). Here also is an early Boy Scouts burial, that of Robert James Alford, who died in 1912 aged 17 and who has the Scouting emblem on his headstone. There is a memorial to the Belgian refugees who died in Bideford during World War I and who are buried in the cemetery.

Across the way on Bowden Green is The Annex, the cemetery extension which was opened when the original 1889 cemetery was closed to burials.

== Gallery ==
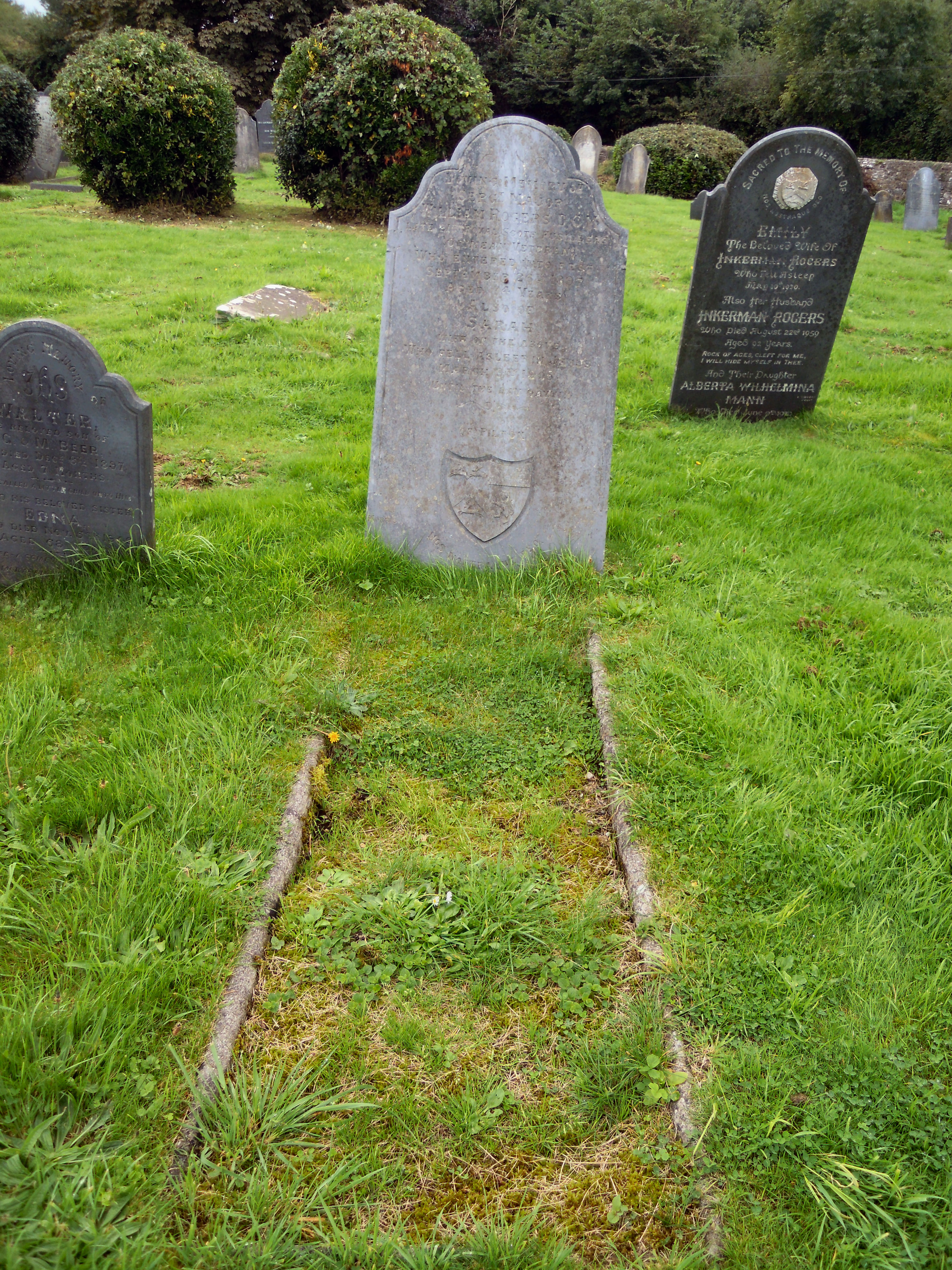
The grave of Crimean War veteran Sgt Major William Rogers

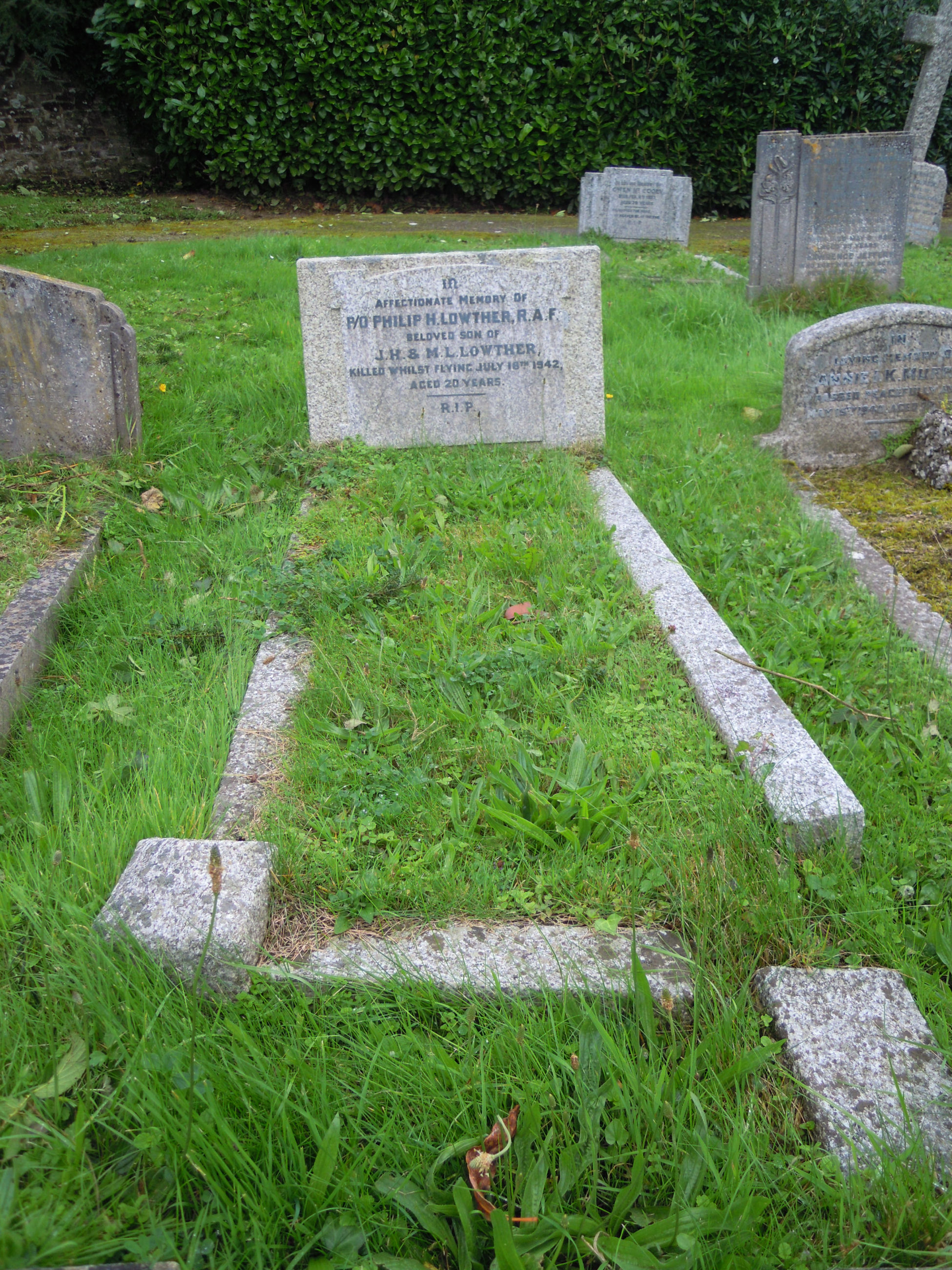
The grave of Pilot Officer Philip Henry Lowther RAF

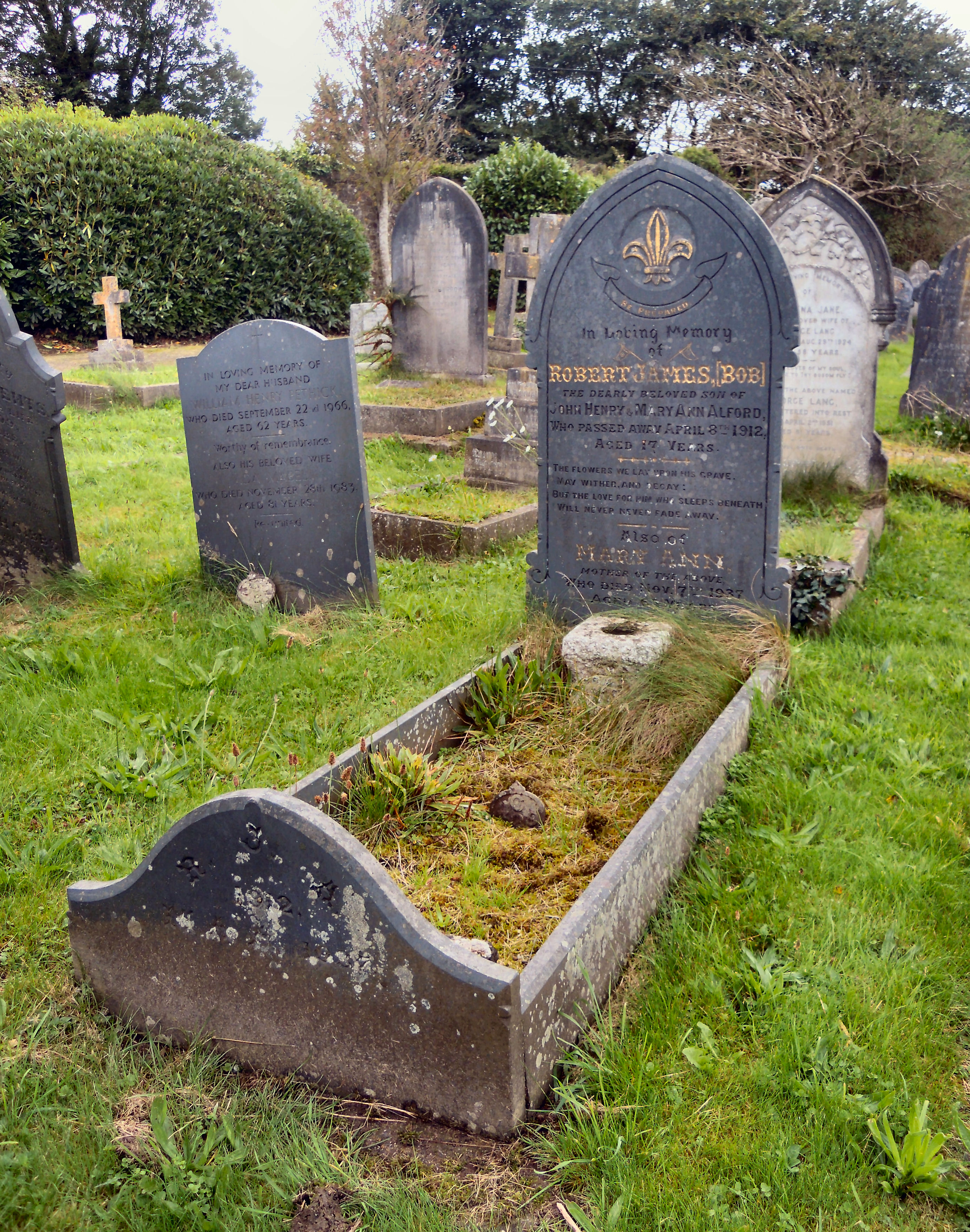
The early Boy Scouts burial of Robert James Alford

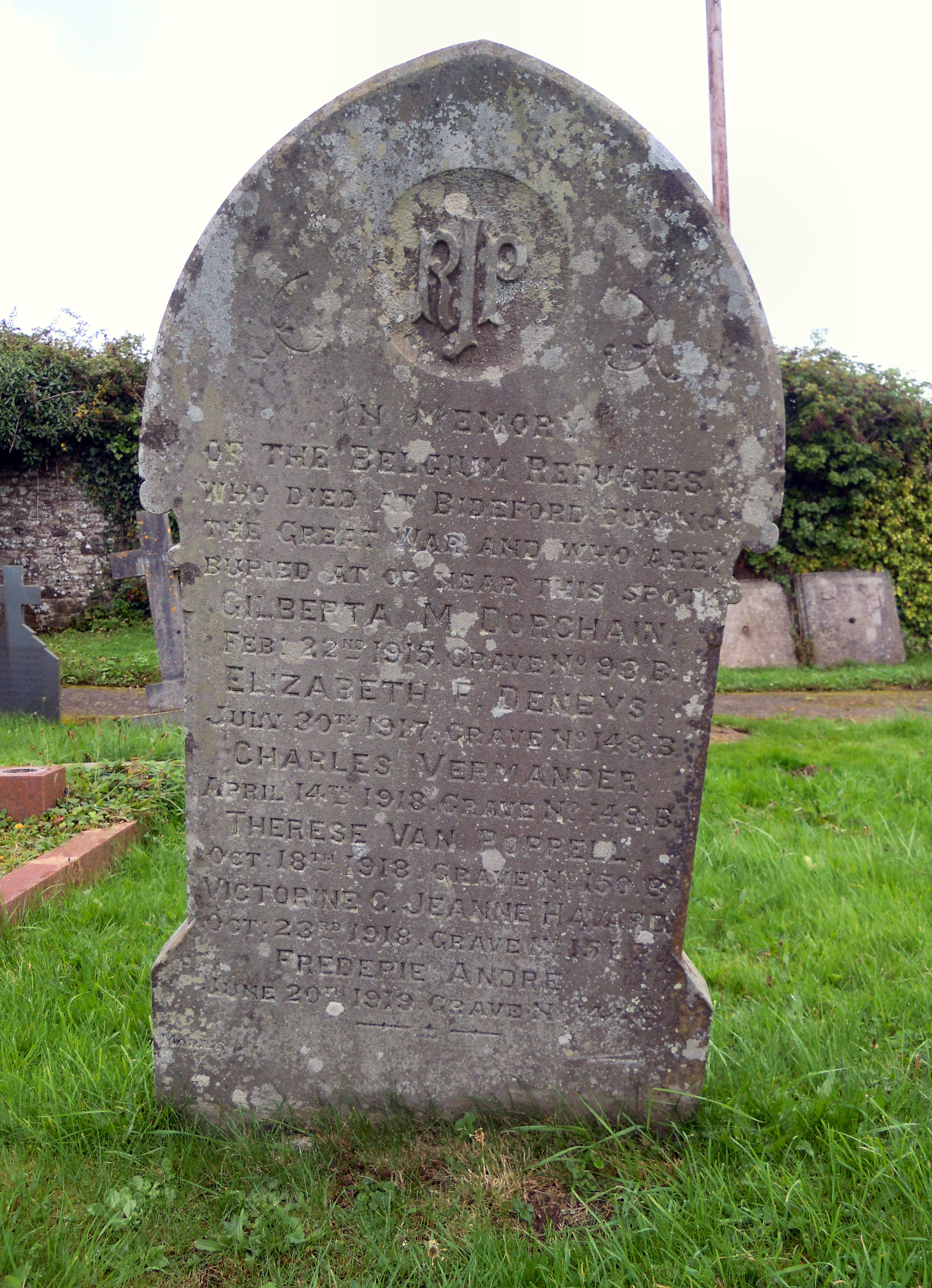
The memorial to the Belgian Refugees who are buried here
