= De Fontaine Memorial =

Monument in Sabah, Malaysia

- Tugu Peringatan De Fontaine
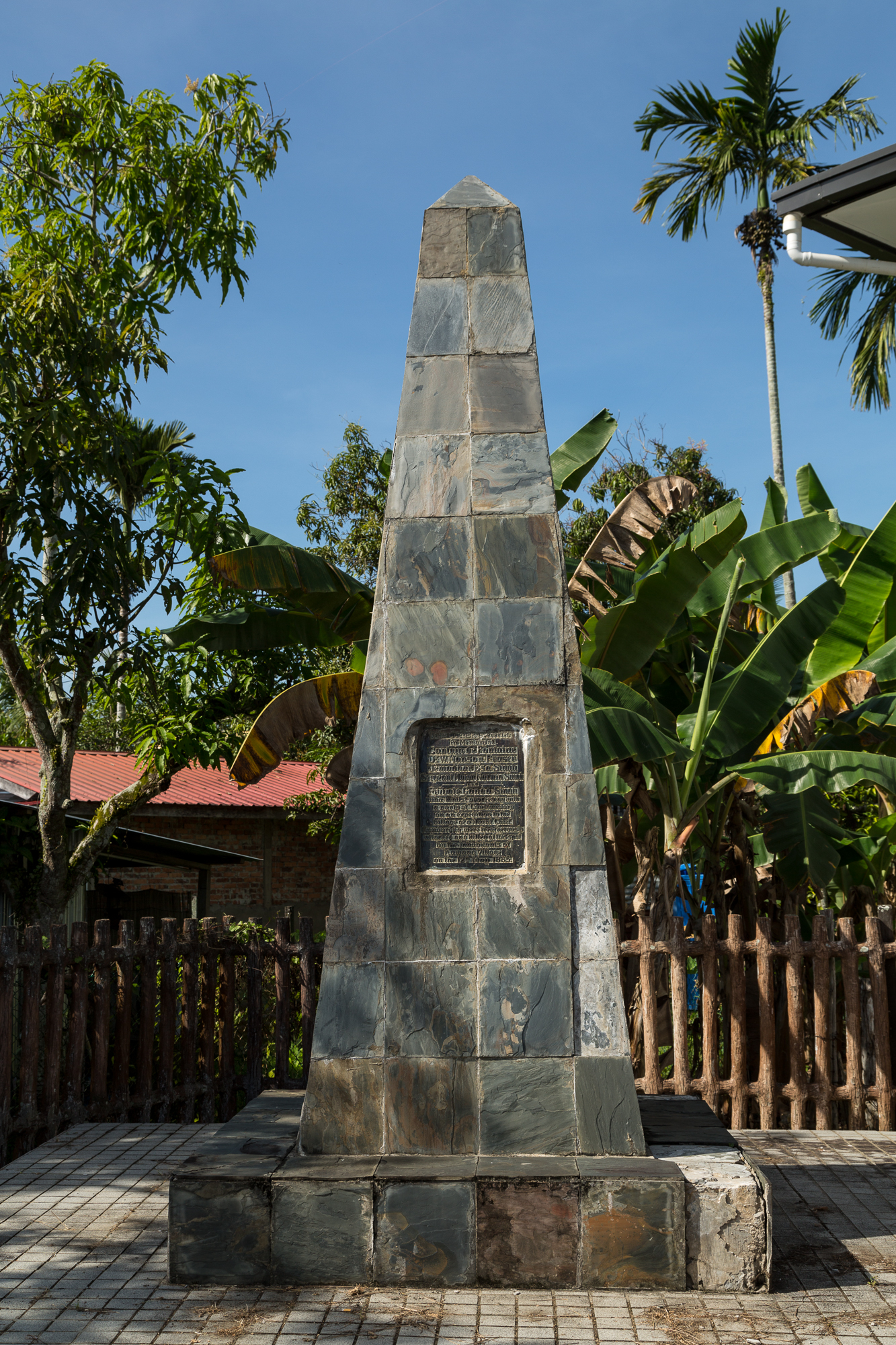
- Interactive map of De Fontaine Memorial
- Location: Kinarut
- Coordinates: 5°46′22″N 116°01′04″E
- Height: 2.5 m (8 ft 2 in)
- Dedicated to: Captain De Fontaine along with several other members

The De Fontaine Memorial (Malay: Tugu Peringatan De Fontaine) is a monument built by the North Borneo Chartered Company to remember an incident on 12 May 1885 that led to an ambush attack to the British North Borneo Constabulary, in which five members of the police force were killed. The monument stands in the village of Kawang in the Malaysian state of Sabah.

== History ==
Captain A.M. de Fontaine was, prior to his recruitment as chief commissioner of the British North Borneo Constabulary, a member of the police forces of Singapore. In May 1885, he led an expedition to search for a Murut Chief, Kandurong, who was known as a cattle thief and head hunter. Under his arrangement, G. L. Davies (Resident of the West Coast), Dr. Donald Manson Fraser, R. M. Little (Resident Assistant) and J. E. G. Wheatley arrived at a village in Kawang on 10 May 1885 along with a detachment of police. As there was a shortage of baggage carriers from the Dusun people to carry items into the mountainous regions of Crocker Range, the Bajau headmen of Kawang were asked to supply them with 30 people. The Bajaus showed little desire to comply with the request by saying that "the carrying of heavy loads is hard for them". Then, the British Resident warned the Bajau headmen that their village would be fined if they did not follow what had been requested. The fight between the resident and the village leader became stronger as a porter from a neighbouring district discovered a stolen water buffalo in the village of the Bajaus. The Bajaus surrendered the water buffalo to the British resident, but the situation remained tense on 12 May as more porters were requested from Papar. The inhabitants of Kawang felt threatened with the request. While all of the British were waiting along with some Indian Constabulary and policemen under a tree, two Bajau men approached them with guns and began a seemingly friendly conversation with the group. Suddenly, without any warning, one of them fatally shot Dr. Fraser at point-blank range. Seven more Bajaus came with spears, running amok and killed three of the Indian Constabulary while wounding eight policemen. Little took up his revolver and gunned down three Bajaus, while another Indian Constabulary managed to seize the Bajau's gun, killing another three Bajaus and wounding two others. Seeing many of their friends been killed, the Bajaus retreated to an open plain and disappeared into the jungle. De Fontaine was severely wounded by spear during the attack and he succumbed to his injuries on 17 May 1885. De Fontaine was buried the next day in a European cemetery of Sandakan.

== Creation of the monument ==
The attack seemed to be forgotten as in 1911, according to the "British North Borneo Herald", J. W. Wilson was probably the only British North Borneo resident who remembered the incident. The tree where the incident occurred has been regarded as the site for the memorial and known as the "Government Tree". However, as the tree had fallen, the Resident at the time proposed erecting a small pillar on the site and fencing it in as a perpetual memorial. An obelisk was built later in September 1912 on the location where Captain De Fontaine was attacked.

== Description ==
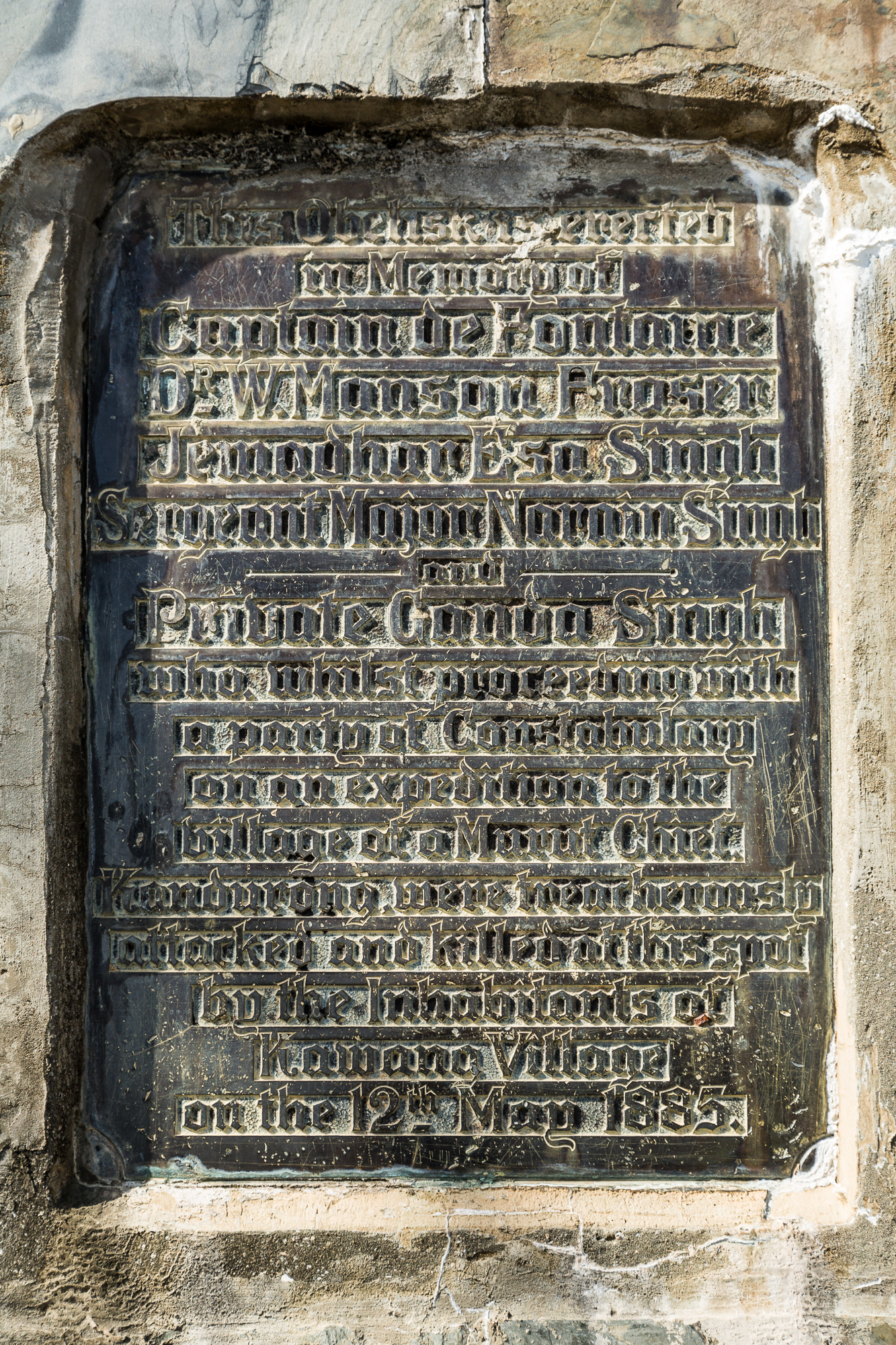
The memorial inscription.

The monument is in the form of an approximately 2.5 metre high obelisk on a simple stepped square base. There is a slight error on the inscription for the name of Dr Fraser. The memorial inscription on the front reads:

This Obelisk is erected
in Memory of
Captaine de Fontaine
Dr. W. Manson Fraser
Jemadhar Esa Singh
Sergeant Major Narnin Singh
and
Private Ganda Singh
who, whilst proceeding with
a party of Constabulary
on an expedition to the
village of a Murut Chief
Kandurong were treacherously
attacked and killed at this spot
by the Inhabitants of
Kawang Village
on the 12th May 1885.
