= Salt Trail =

Ancient trade route in Sabah

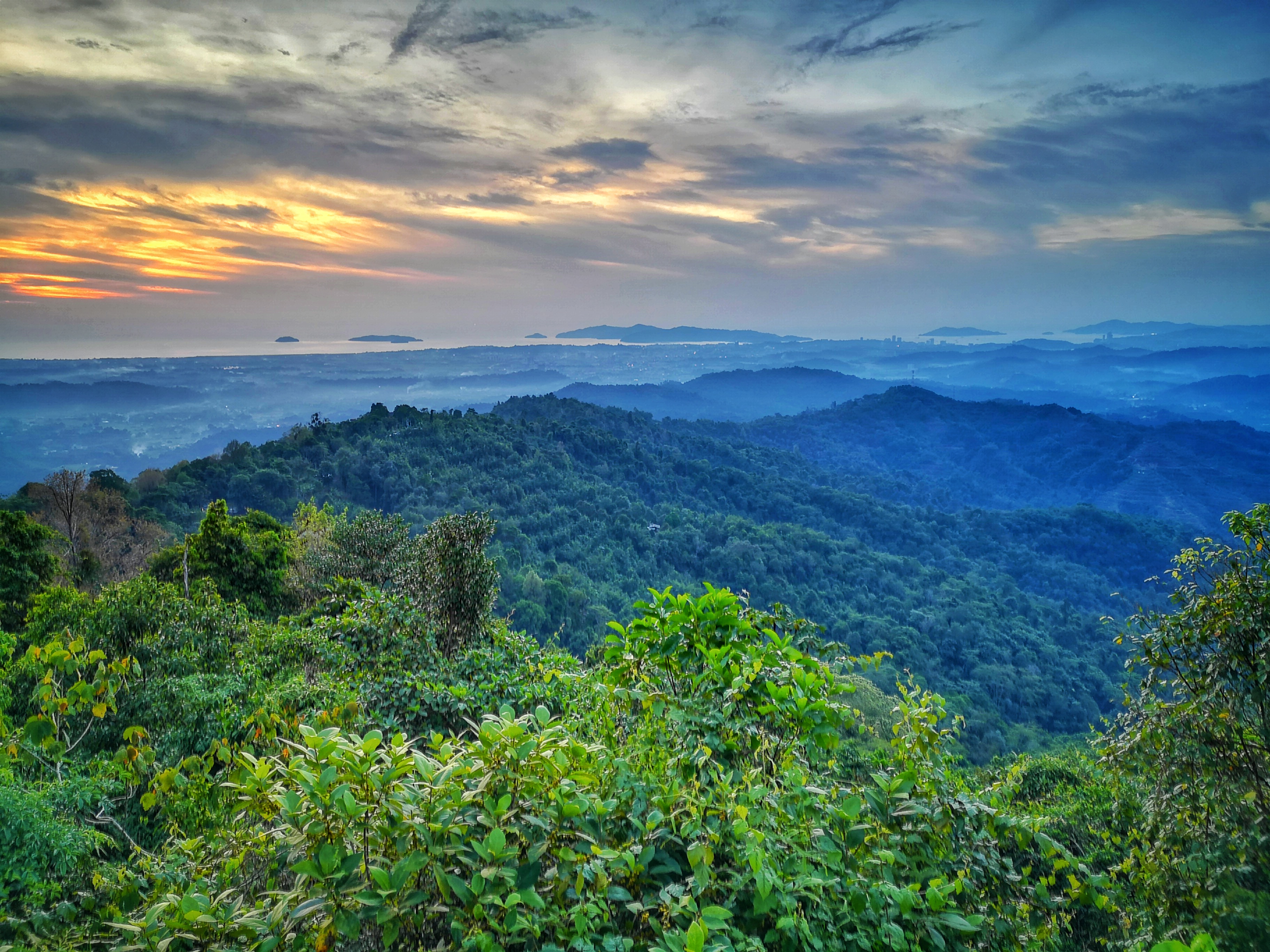
- Location: Crocker Range National Park, Crocker Mountains, Sabah
- Established: 2000 B.C.
- Maintainer: Sabah Parks

The Salt Trail, Salt Track, Salt Route, or Jalan Garam, is a collective of ancient salt roads that cross over the Crocker Mountains from the coastal and riverine villages of Penampang District to the hilly interior villages of the Tambunan District. This trail has been used for at least 4,000 years by the Kadazan-Dusun, Murut and other native denizens of inland Sabah to trade jungle-sourced goods and commodities for salt and other trade goods at the tamu in Inobong, Penampang. Today, it is still the only accessible route to reach the remote villages within Crocker Range National Park, and is promoted by Sabah Parks as a ecotourist attraction. Others, however, have rebuked the Parks for the practice of dark tourism here, acknowledging the centuries-long intertribal conflicts that spawned in this region for the dominance of the trail. The most famous war for control over the Salt Trail was brokered by Aki Sagunting, a Kota Marudu Dusun tribal warrior with a Planting of the Stone in the 18th century. Another smaller but still deadly war for control over the trail was the Tagahas–Liwan War, fought between the Tagahas as well as Liwan Dusun tribes.
