= George Channer =

Army officer and Victoria Cross winner

George Channer VC CB
- General George Nicolas Channer VC
- Born: 7 January 1842; Allahabad, British India
- Died: 13 December 1905 (aged 63); Westward Ho!, Devon
- Burial place: East-the-Water Cemetery, Bideford
- Military career
- Allegiance: United Kingdom
- Branch: British Indian Army
- Service years: 1859–1901
- Rank: General
- Units: 1st Gurkha Rifles
- Conflicts: Umbeyla Campaign; Perak War; Sungei Ujong War; Battle of Bukit Putus; Jowaki Expedition; Second Anglo-Afghan War; Battle of Peiwar Kotal; Hazara Expedition of 1888
- Awards: Victoria Cross; Order of the Bath

General George Nicolas Channer VC CB (7 January 1842 – 13 December 1905) was a recipient of the Victoria Cross, the highest and most prestigious award for gallantry in the face of the enemy that can be awarded to British and Commonwealth forces. He was the first to ever be awarded the VC in Malaya.

== Life ==
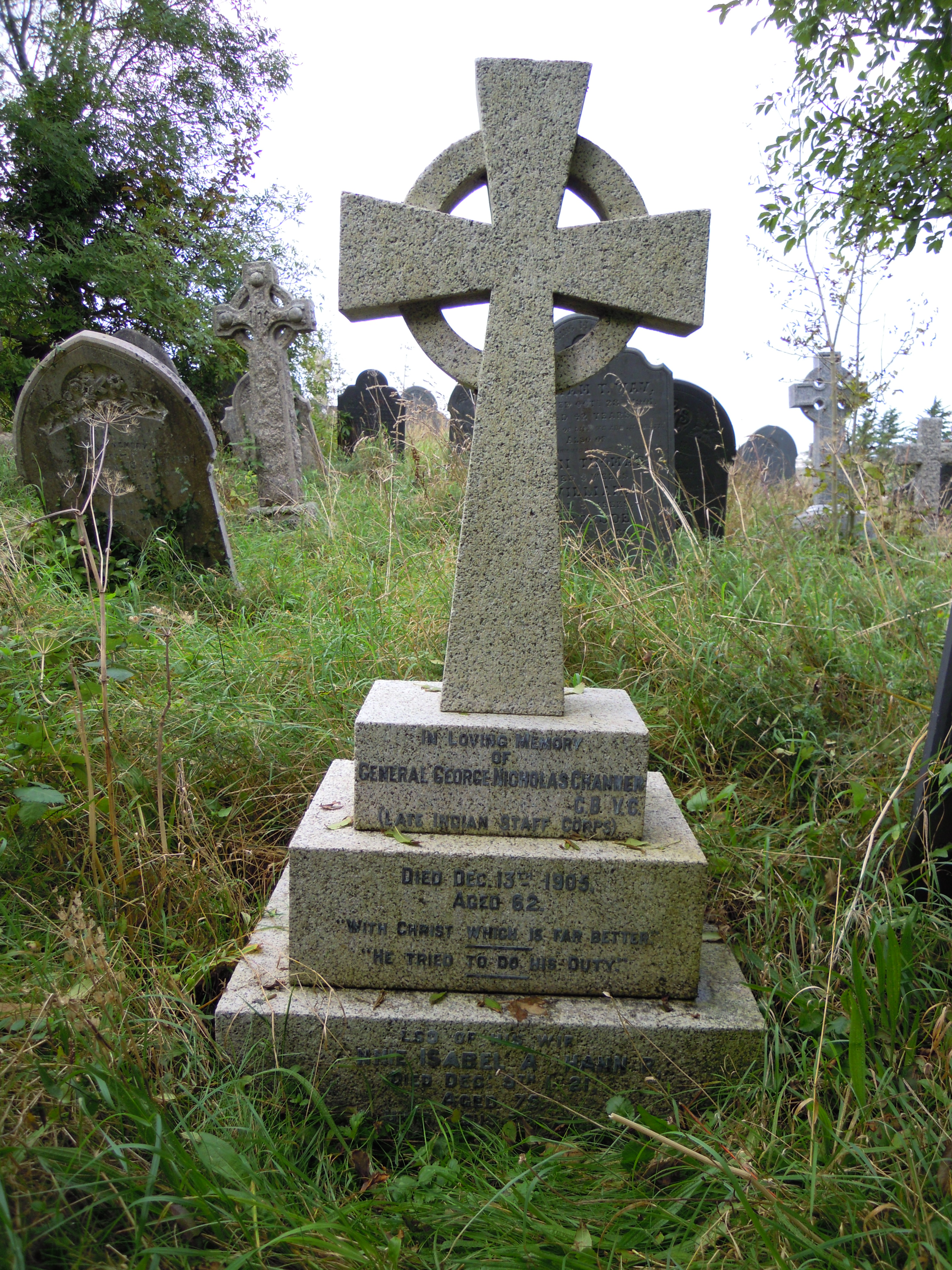
The grave of George Channer VC in East-the-Water Cemetery in Bideford

George Channer was born at Allahabad, India, on 7 January 1842, the eldest surviving son of eight children of George Girdwood Channer, colonel, Bengal artillery (1811–1895) and Susan (d. 1895), daughter of Nicholas Kendall JP, vicar of Talland and Lanlivery, Cornwall. He was educated at Cheltenham College.

Joining the army in September 1859, he served in India with the 89th and 95th regiments, seeing active service in the Ambela campaign of 1863–4. In August 1866 he entered the Bengal Staff Corps, serving with the Indian Army for the remainder of his career.

He was 32 years old, and a captain in the Bengal Staff Corps, Indian Army, and 1st Gurkha Rifles during the Battle of Bukit Putus when, on 20 December 1875 in Negri Sembilan, Malaya, Captain Channer performed the deed for which he was awarded the VC. Channer had been despatched with a small party to obtain intelligence of the position and strength of the enemy's stockade. Having located it, he jumped in, taking the enemy by surprise. After shooting one man dead with his revolver, the rest of Channer's party entered the stockade, which they captured. The stockade was formidable and it would have been impossible to bring guns to bear on it because of the steepness of the hill and the density of the jungle. If Captain Channer and his party had not been able to take the stockade in this manner it would have been necessary to resort to the bayonet, with consequent great loss of life. In addition to the VC, in April 1876 Channer was mentioned in dispatches and promoted to brevet major.

Channer served with the Jowaki Expedition in 1877 and the Second Anglo-Afghan War (1978–80). Here he was with the 29th Punjabi infantry in the Kurram Valley Field Force, commanding the regiment at the Battle of Peiwar Kotal in December 1878. He was made a brevet lieutenant-colonel in November 1879 and a colonel in the army in November 1883, at the early age of forty-one. He commanded a brigade in the Hazara Expedition of 1888, after which he was made a companion of the Order of the Bath (CB). He attained the rank of major-general in April 1893, lieutenant-general on 9 November 1896 and General in January 1899. He retired in November 1901.

He died at the age of 63 on 13 December 1905 at Westward Ho!, Devon. He was buried in East-the-Water Cemetery, Bideford, in a grave adjacent to that of Gerald Graham VC.

His Victoria Cross medal group is in the Lord Ashcroft Gallery at the Imperial War Museum.

== Family ==
He married in June 1872, Annie Isabella, daughter of John William Watson. They had four surviving sons (two served in the army) and four daughters, one of which is Mary Eva Channer who married Ronald AA Kinloch. Mary Eva and Ronald had two Sons, Ian Kinloch and Bruce Kinloch who also joined the army and was commissioned into the 3rd Queen Alexandra's own Gurkha Rifles, winning the Military Cross for his part in the battle of Sitang River Bridge in 1942. At the age of 25 he commanded the battalion.

== See also ==
- List of Brigade of Gurkhas recipients of the Victoria Cross
