= Wilfrid Carne Cole-Adams =

Commandant of the North Borneo Constabulary (born 1894)

The Honourable Wilfrid Carne Cole-Adams MC
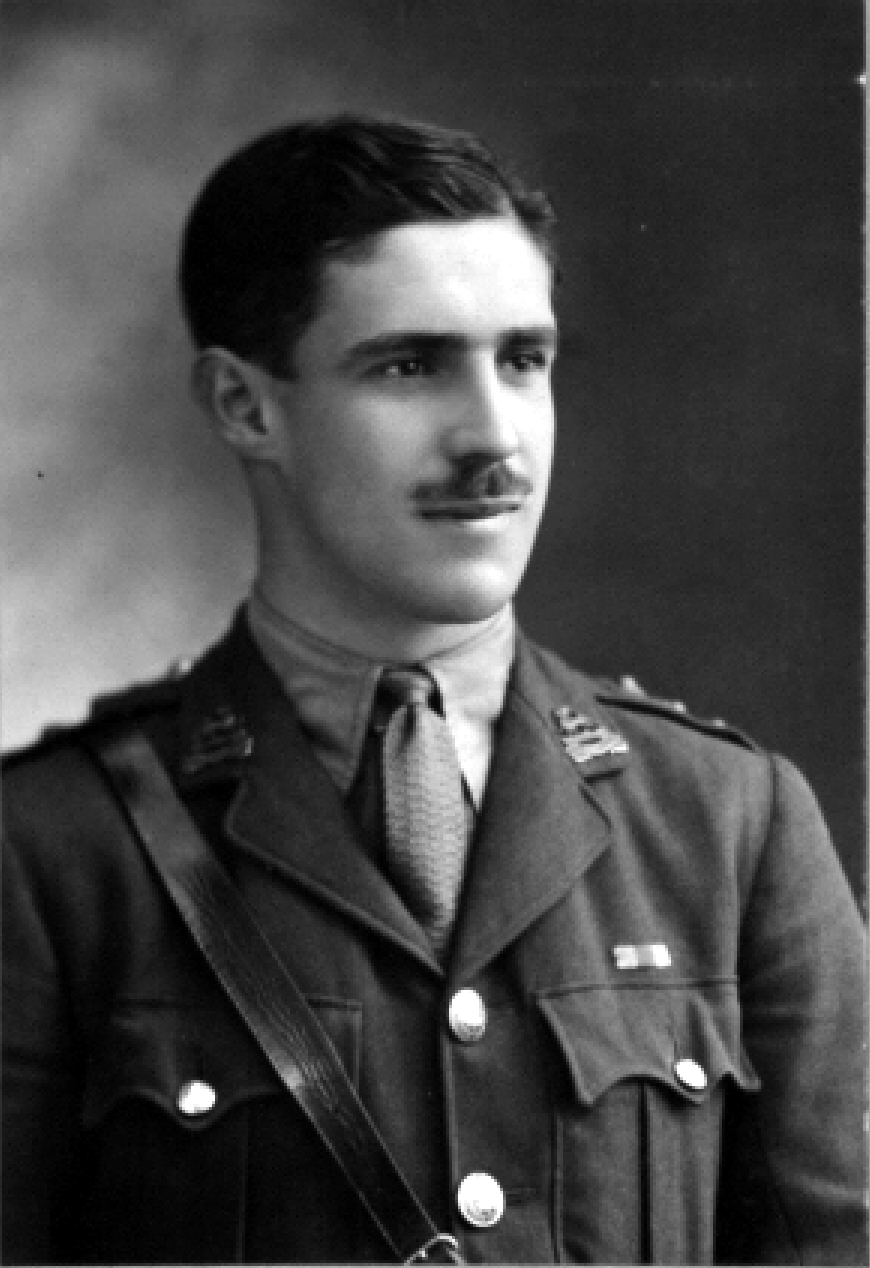

9th Commandant of the North Borneo Armed Constabulary
- In office 16 April 1931 – 16 May 1942 (POW)
- Appointed by: Arthur Frederick Richards
- Preceded by: Henry Stanley Bond
- Succeeded by: Alan Rice-Oxley

Personal details
- Born: 10 May 1894 Chiswick or Brentford, Middlesex, England, United Kingdom
- Died: ?
- Spouse: Edith Dorothy Bunbury
- Relations: Bernard Randall Cole-Adams (executed) (Brother)
- Parents: Alfred Cole-Adams; Ethel King Redman
- Education: Merton College, University of Oxford
- Awards

Military service
- Branch/service: Royal Berkshire Regiment; North Borneo Armed Constabulary
- Rank: Lieutenant Colonel
- Battles/wars: World War I; Battle of Arras (1917); Battle of the Somme; Battle of Cambrai (1918); World War II; Sandakan Resistance

Wilfrid Carne Cole-Adams (abbreviated as W.C. Adams, W.C.C. Adams, W. Carne Adams or W. Cole-Adams) was a British military officer who served as the Commandant of the North Borneo Armed Constabulary.

== Biography ==
=== Early life and World War I ===
Adams attended St. Paul's and graduated from Merton College, University of Oxford in 1913.

At the outset of World War I, he joined the 2nd Battalion, Royal Berkshire Regiment. In July 1916, he was wounded in action on the first day of the Battle of the Somme, during the attack on Ovillers. He returned to the field, and on 17 March 1917, he fought with the regiment at the Battle of Arras. He led a raid on an enemy trench, and later assisted in the rescue of a wounded soldier. In March 1917, while stationed in Arras, Adams was authorized to wear the rank of Captain in the 5th Battalion. On 30 October, he was wounded again after being shot in the right leg by a bullet from a machine gun at the battle of Battle of Cambrai.

Adams was awarded the Military Cross at the 1918 New Year Honours for his actions at Arras.

=== British North Borneo Constabulary ===
In 1922, Adams left Sandakan and went to Jesselton, appointed as the Acting Adjutant of the Constabulary.

In 1925, he took over the Beaufort District from Mr. Skinner.

In May 1926, when Charles Herbert Harington retired from the Constabulary, he was replaced by Henry Stanley Bond as Commandant. Adams went to Sandakan to become the Chief Police Officer there. He was officially appointed to the position in June.

In May 1927, he served as Acting Commandant of the Constabulary.

In July 1927, he was appointed Officer Commanding of the Armed Constabulary and inspector of prisons.

On 1 November 1927, he led the Charter Day celebrations at the head of the colour guard procession for the Charter Day Parade.

On 14 March 1930, Adams, as the officer-in-charge of the Constabulary for the East Coast Residency, greeted the newly installed Governor of North Borneo, Arthur Frederick Richards.

=== Commandant of the North Borneo Armed Constabulary ===
In 1931, after Commandant Bond went on "furlough prior to retirement," Adams took over the position, first as Acting Commandant, officially being appointed to the position in June.

At some point around 1931 or 1932, Adams was personally invited by the Rajah of Sarawak to re-organize the Sarawak Constabulary.

By 1936, the Jesselton detachment under Adams' command was commanded by Captains Charles Douglas Round-Turner and Alan Rice-Oxley.

In June 1939, Adams was awarded the Colonial Police Medal at the King's Birthday Honours.

In November 1939, Adams was appointed to the Central Committee for the North Borneo General War Relief Fund.

=== World War II ===
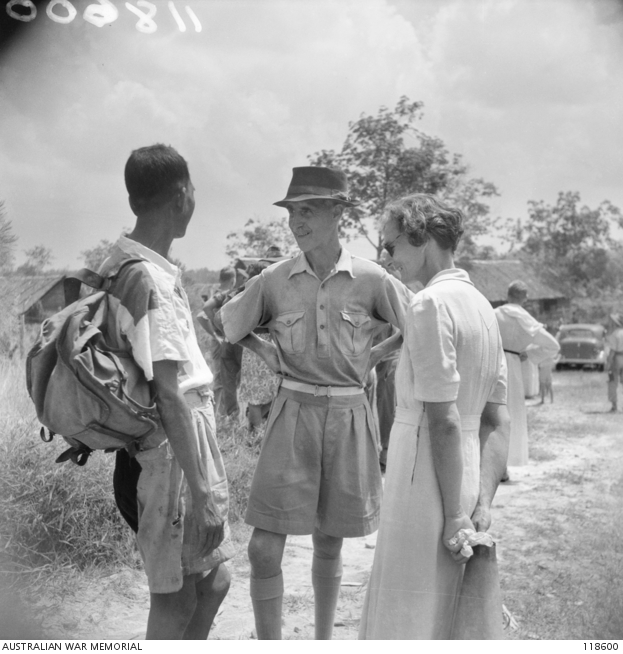
Adams (center) and his wife (right) speaking to Constabulary Inspector Guriaman the day after the liberation of Batu Lintang camp.

When the Japanese invaded Borneo in 1942, the Chartered Company issued orders to North Borneo to surrender the country. Adams was among the first men to negotiate terms of North Borneo's surrender in Beaufort with the Japanese.

Adams was taken and interred to be a prisoner of war at Berhala Island with his brother, Bernard Randal Cole-Adams. He was then moved to Batu Lintang camp. From July 1942 to 14 November 1944, he served as Assistant Camp Master. After 1 November 1944, he was made Camp Master until the liberation of the camp by allied forces. On 11 September 1945, Batu Lintang was liberated by the Australian 9th Division. It was only at the end of September 1945 that the Bunbury's – his wife's parents – received word that Adams and his wife were still alive.

== Personal life ==
In 1921, Adams was the best man for the marriage of V. H. Benthan and F. W. Barber.

By 1922, Adams was a member of the Jesselton Turf Club (the horse racing club of Jesselton), and his racing horse was named Penyangat.

By 1925, his racing horse Hantu rushed the jumps during a race.

In 1926, Adams was engaged to Edith Dorothy "Dorie" Bunbury, niece of the Resident of Sandakan, and a twin daughter of Paymaster-Captain C. R. Bunbury. They were married 30 April 1927 at Sandakan.

== Dates of rank ==
Rank	Date	Unit	Ref.
Lieutenant		2nd Battalion, Royal Berkshire Regiment	
Captain	24 March 1917	5th Battalion, Royal Berkshire Regiment	
Major	April 1932	North Borneo Armed Constabulary	
Lieutenant Colonel		North Borneo Armed Constabulary	

== Written works ==
- The Constabulary of North Borneo
