= Lions of Borneo =

Borneo resistance against Japanese occupation

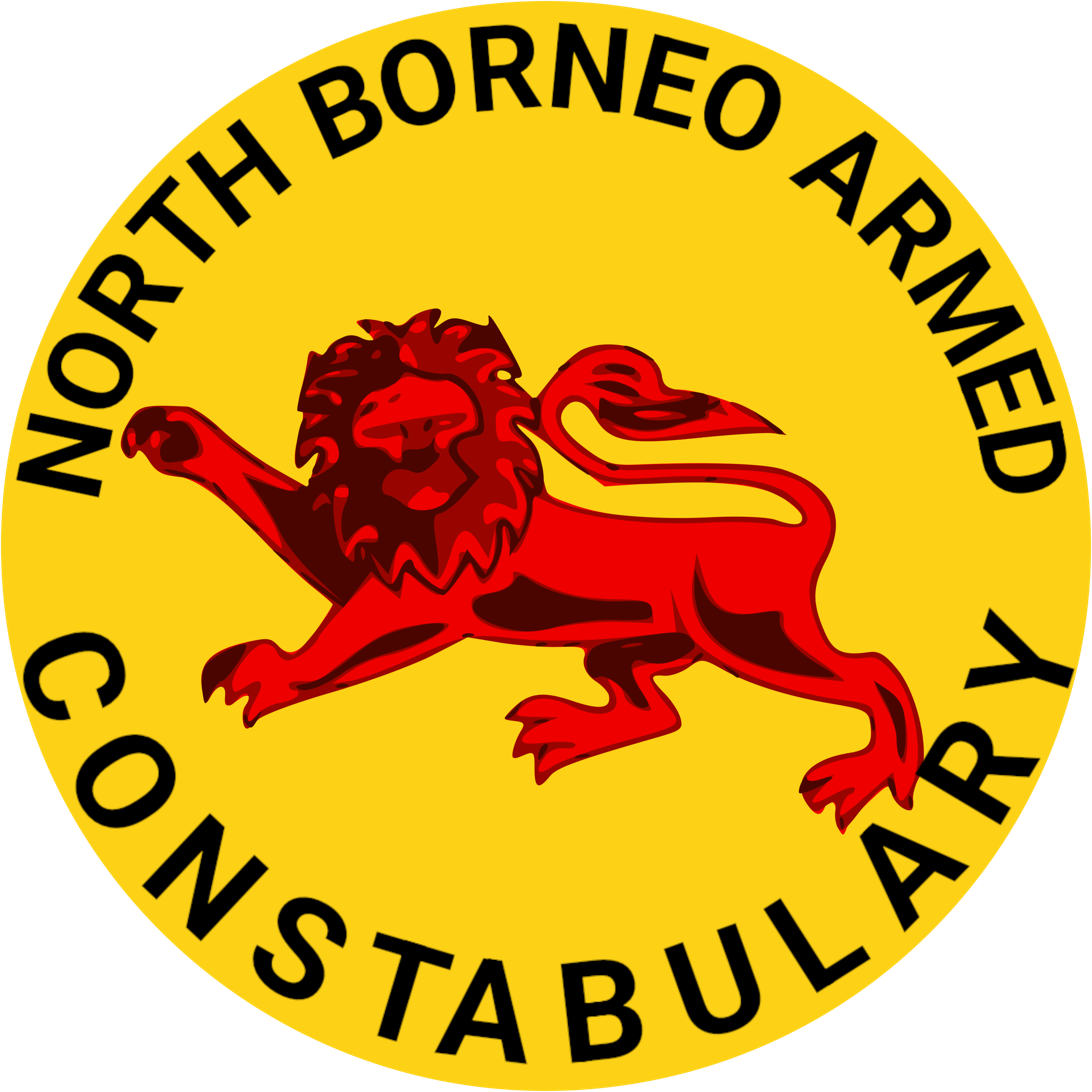
- Active: 1942–1945
- Disbanded: 1945
- Countries: North Borneo; United Kingdom; Australia; Commonwealth of the Philippines
- Type: Resistance movement
- Part of: North Borneo Armed Constabulary
- Garrison/HQ: Berhala Island and Sandakan Camp
- Motto: PERGO ET PERAGO
- Engagements: World War II

Commanders
- Governor of North Borneo: Governor Robert Smith
- Commandant: Alan Rice-Oxley
- Commandant: Lionel Matthews †
- Outside Commander: James P. Taylor

The Lions of Borneo, also known as the Sandakan Resistance, were those members of the North Borneo Armed Constabulary and its reserves, the North Borneo Volunteer Force, who formed the underground resistance network in the town of Sandakan against the Imperial Japanese Armed Forces during their occupation of Japanese North Borneo. The Lions heavily assisted in the escape of dozens of prisoners of war from the island of Borneo, but their network was uncovered by the Japanese. Nine of the Lions were beheaded, and the Commandant of the Constabulary, Lionel Matthews, was shot dead.

== History ==
On 19 January 1942, Governor Robert Smith, acting on orders received from the British, capitulated and surrendered to the Empire of Japan. Smith and the other heads of government were ordered by the Japanese to stay in their posts to recall firearms and issue a surrender to the forces of North Borneo. Most of these government administrators were then interned several weeks later at Berhala Island, but some civilians were allowed to stay under house arrest or confined to their villages. Several others were allowed to remain in Sandakan. The administration of Japanese North Borneo officially absorbed the Constabulary. However, the Constabulary secretly remained loyal to their former Commandant, and remained working under secret orders from Governor Smith and the Constabulary commanders interned in the camps around Borneo.

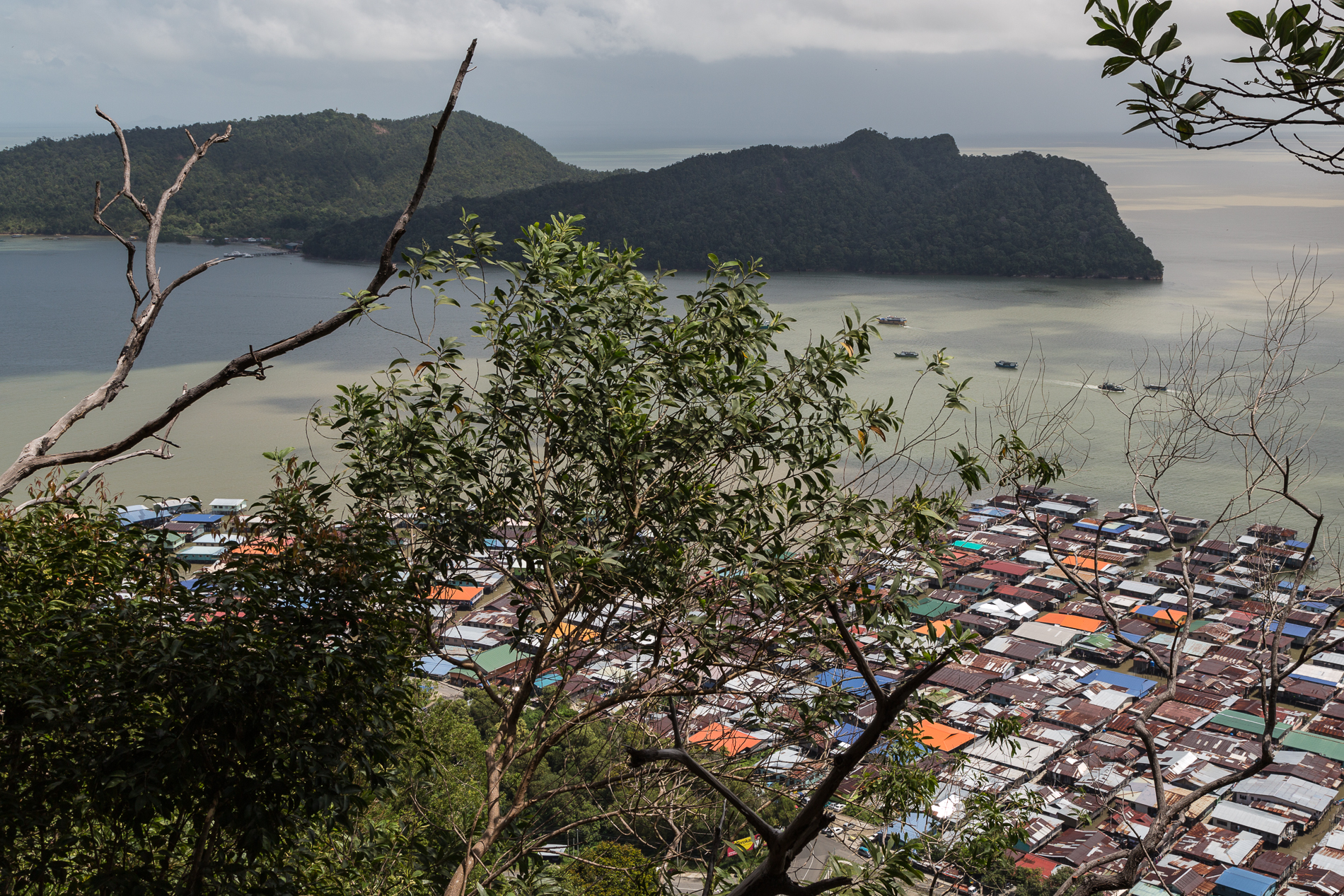
Berhala Island as it appears today, with the village of Kampung Berhala Darat in the foreground. This island, formerly used as a leper colony, was home to a massive concentration camp during the war.

The primary method of communication was through the town's doctor, James P. Taylor, who had been allowed to maintain his clinic in Sandakan to provide care for the Japanese soldiers and local citizens living under the occupation. To make normal shipments of medical supplies that the Japanese were not aware were being brought into the camps, Taylor forged dozens of bills-of-sale in his drug store. In this fashion, he secretly supplied the camps with field bandages, vitamins, quinine, motrin tablets and other drugs. He also snuck in supplies for the POWs to make portable radios.

The couriers for this service were members of the Constabulary, who carried the supplies, and secret messages encoded by Taylor's wife who kept a codebook and cipher blocks hidden in their house. Outside of the camp, the leader of the Constabulary's resistance effectively became Dr. Taylor. Taylor also secretly organised a secret collection of funds for any POWs that managed to escape, and secretly organised food to be delivered into the camps. The Japanese sent the first group of Australia's 8th Division POWs, B Force, to Sandakan camp in July 1942. Another unit of the 8th Division, E Force, was sent initially to Kuching, and then to Berhala Island in April 1943. Before either of these groups had arrived, Taylor and his wife had managed to set up a functioning intelligence system for the civilian POWs of the camps to communicate with each other.

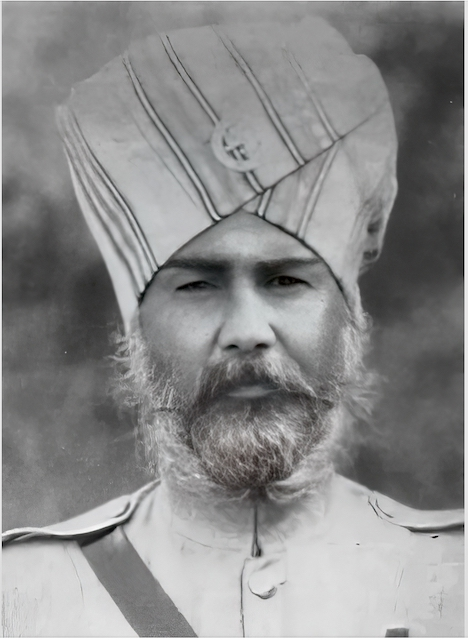
The Lion of Borneo, Jemedar Ojagah Singh, was one of the senior NCOs in the Sandakan resistance.

The Commandant of the Constabulary, Alan Rice-Oxley, had been taken to Berhala Island alongside Governor Smith, maintaining the underground continuity of government. Constabulary Corporal Arbin, with the help of several Constabulary warrant officers named Jamadara Singh, Curaiaman Singh, Yangsalan Singh, and Ojaga Singh, passed weekly notes to those detained in Sandakan. Major Rice-Oxley on Berhala became the "clandestine Commander" of the Constabulary, and led the coordination activities among the prisoners of the 8th Division for their escape plan.

Sandakan's chief engineer before the war, O. Mavor, had been allowed by the Japanese to stay in the town confined to the bungalow next to the engineer works and power station. A Chinese man named Ernesto Lagan, who had been hired by the Japanese to work in the Constabulary as a detective, supplied Mavor with information about Japanese troop movements and machine gun posts. Mavor then broadcast this information via enciphered radio broadcasts to be picked-up by the receivers in the camps. Communications from the Constabulary on the outside were regular and constant, via the secret mail and radio communications. Wherever POW camps in the area were in eyesight of one-another, they would use lamp signaling.

In October 1942, a Chinese man named Mu Sing showed up at Sandakan and reported to the underground Constabulary. He was an officer in a Philippine resistance organisation commanded by the son-in-law of the Sultan of Sulu which was at Batu Batu. Sing acted as a conduit between the POWs and two allied submarines stationed at Batu Batu. In December, the Filipinos supplied the Australians – through the North Borneo Constabulary – a map of Batu Batu. They also buried a cache of weapons on the road at Batu 8 (the 8-mile marker).

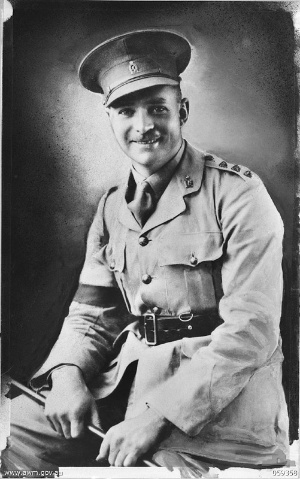
Lionel Matthews was given the "clandestine" command of the Constabulary when Alan Rice-Oxley was sent to Kuching in January 1943.

However, when Rice-Oxley was sent to Kuching in January 1943, communication between Berhla Island and Sandakan was lost for three months, until April 1943, when E Force arrived there. It was at Kuching where Rice-Oxley met Lionel Matthews. When they discovered that Matthews would be shipped-out to Berhala, Rice-Oxley made Lionel Matthews the new Commandant of the Constabulary. When Matthew arrived at Berhala, he then made introductions with Governor Smith, who confirmed his appointment as Commandant.

Several attempts at escape from the camps were made prior to April 1943, facilitated by the Constabulary, but they mostly failed. When E Force arrived at Berhala, a more solid escape plan was put together. Only three days after Matthews arrived on the island, he sent Constabulary Corporal Koram bin Anduat with a message to Sandakan Camp that preparations were being made for an escape in June.

On 5 June 1943, sometime before 3:30am (when the Japanese discovered they were missing), Seven POWs escaped from the camp: Private R. N. McLaren, Private R. J. Kennedy, Staff Sergeant Wallace, Lieutenant Wagner, Lieutenant R. Blow, Lieutenant L. N. Gillon, and Captain Steele. They got away from the camp without discovery and linked-up with the Philippine Resistance, arriving in Australia six months later.

The next month, July 1944, another escape was planned on the blueprint of the July escape. However, this attempt was betrayed. There were at least three spies planted by the Japanese living among the people at Sandakan, but this traitor was named Jackie Loh, a local from Sandakan who got in a business dispute with a Chinese man named Joo Ming.

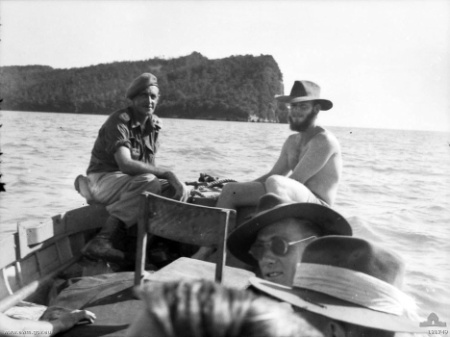
Jock McLaren, one of the POWs who escaped from Berhala Island, returning there after the war. This escape would not have been possible without the members of the Constabulary.

The camps were searched, and that summer many of the prisoners were then "arrested" by the Japanese. They were severely tortured on a regular basis until February 1944 – a duration of over a year – with the suspected men often kept in bamboo cages. In February, they were "tried" in court and found guilty of aiding the escape.

On 2 March 1944, Detective Ernesto Lagan Sr., Jemader (Warrant Officer) Ojagah Singh, Lieutenant Felix Azcona (of the Fillippino guerrillas), Sergeant Arbin, Heng Joo Ming, Constable Alexander Funk, Wong Mu Sing, and Matusup Bin Gungau were taken by the Japanese to an unknown location and beheaded. Lionel Matthews was shot, thus ending his command of the Constabulary. The engineer Mavor died in a civil jail in Japanese Singapore on 5 May 1945 of malnutrition. The survivors of Berhala Island and Sandakan were then forced to march in the Sandakan Death Marches. As the name implies, many of them died.

After the war, medals of gallantry were awarded to those survivors of the Constabulary, including to Corporal Koram.

Corporal Koram was awarded the MBE.

== See also ==
- Anti-Japanese resistance movement in Malaya during World War II
- Malayan Peoples' Anti-Japanese Army
