= Labuk Bay Revolt =

1919 labour riot in North Borneo

- Date: 1919
- Location: Labuk Bay Tobacco Estate, North Borneo

Parties
Tobacco workers
- Labuk Bay Tobacco Estate
- North Borneo Chartered Company
(North Borneo) Henry Stanley Bond

Units involved
	British North Borneo Constabulary

Casualties and losses
	2x (+)

The Labuk Bay Revolt was a labour revolt at the Labuk Bay Tobacco Estate in North Borneo. The European Assistant Van der Toerran and a Javanese man both lost their lives.
