= Charter Day =

Charter Day is a term that applies to the official celebration of the signing of a charter.

Charter Day may also refer to:

- Charter Day (June 26) the annual celebration of the signing of the Charter of the United Nations
- Charter Day (North Borneo) (November 1) celebrating the signing of the Charter of North Borneo
- Cagayan de Oro Charter Day, a public holiday in the Philippines
- Charter Day School, a school in Leland, North Carolina
