= Henry Stanley Bond =

Commandant of North Borneo Armed Constabulary (1876–1954)

The Honourable, Henry Stanley Bond
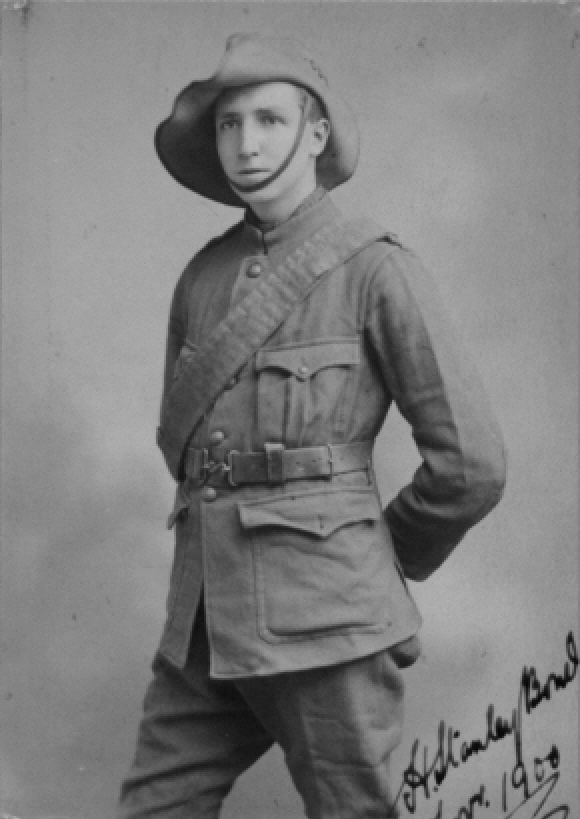

8th Commandant of the North Borneo Armed Constabulary
- In office 1 June 1926 – 15 April 1931
- Preceded by: Charles Herbert Harington
- Succeeded by: Wilfrid Carne Cole-Adams

Personal details
- Born: 22 April 1876 Aldershot, Hampshire, England
- Died: 9 March 1954 (aged 77) Newton Abbot, Devon, England
- Spouse: Ida Rose Maxwell (m. 1907)
- Relations: Charles Douglas Round-Turner (Son-in-law)
- Children: Barbara Maxwell
- Parents: Charles Frederick Bond; Mary Alice Blanche White

Military service
- Branch/service: Artists' Rifles; British North Borneo Constabulary; War Office
- Rank: Lieutenant colonel
- Battles/wars: Second Boer War; Sigunting War; Mat Salleh Rebellion; Tomani Expedition; Kawang Raid; Rundum Rebellion; World War I; Silimpopon Riots

Henry Stanley Bond was a British military officer who served as the Commandant of the North Borneo Armed Constabulary. Except for service in the Boer War, and a brief stint at the War Office during the First World War, his entire time in government was served in North Borneo. He served in the Constabulary for 30 years.

== Early life ==
Henry Stanley Bond was born into a military family at 1 Alexandra Villa, Victoria Road, Aldershot, Hampshire, in 1876. He was the sixth of eleven children. His father was Lieutenant Colonel Charles Frederick Bond, formerly of the Madras Light Infantry, originally from Cawnpore. His mother was Mary Bond (formerly White). His grandfather was Major and Brevet Lieutenant-Colonel Henry M. Bond of the 15th Hussars.

Much of his childcare duties were performed by the three servants living in his home; Sara Ann Matters, a domestic servant, and nurses Elizabeth Bateson and Henrietta Jeffrey. At the age of 4, his occupation was listed as "scholar."

Bond fought in the Second Boer War.

== British North Borneo Constabulary ==
By the turn of the twentieth century, the country of North Borneo was now two decades old, having been established in 1881 under the sole governing authority of the North Borneo Chartered Company, a chartered company. "The Company's" London headquarters had just been relocated to Threadneedle Street, City of London. As the sole governing authority over an entire country, the company was also responsible for that country's security, and maintained the British North Borneo Constabulary (it changed its name in 1926 to the North Borneo Armed Constabulary), which served a dual purpose as North Borneo's only military and police force. In the year 1900, in his birth town of Aldershot, one of the unit's former Commandants, John Murray Reddie, was stationed at the Aldershot Garrison around that time, as the Adjutant of the newly established 3rd Battalion of the Worcestershire Regiment.

After a series of interviews in front of a board and exams at Threadneedle Street, Bond joined the Constabulary as a Cadet in 1901. He arrived in North Borneo with his wife on 3 April 1901, aboard the SS Kelantan.

In 1905, Bond commanded an expedition to Maradu Bay to quell an insurrection there led by Dato Undok, the Dato of a village near Timbang Batu. At Maradu, he joined Resident Dunlop, who was already on-site.

By the end of 1905, Bond was the Superintendent of Gaols, and released around 10 prisoners from Kudat Jail who had contracted beri beri and other diseases.

In 1906, Bond commanded the Tomani Expedition to pursue a force of Murut Rebels. They brought a 7-Pounder with them and used it against the Rebels. During this expedition his force encountered a swarm of bees, which caused some of his men to dive out of the way. Bond mistook the commotion for an enemy force, shouted "Ambush!" and drew his sword, before realizing that they were just bees.

In 1908, Bond led several expeditions to pursue Pak Musa.

In 1915, Bond gave a speech welcoming the new Kapitan Cina, Lam Man Ching, to Sandakan.

During World War I, from 3 July 1917 to 16 September 1918, Bond went on "furlough" to London, where he served as Contract Officer at the War Office.

In 1919, a labour riot broke out at the Labuk Bay Tobacco Estate in Labuk Bay (Labuk). A Dutch man named Mr. Van der Toerran and a Javanese man were killed. Bond commanded a force of the Constabulary to respond to the riot, and captured the rebels.

In 1921, after the Silimpopon Riots broke out at Silimpopon, Bond marched out with a contingent from Sandakan to contain the situation. They arrested 300 workers.

By 1923, Bond was the Chief Police Officer of Sandakan, in charge of that town's police force.

In 1926, as Bond became the Commandant of the Constabulary at Jesselton, taking over the command from Charles Herbert Harington. Captain Cole-Adams moved to Sandakan to take over Bond's old command there. Cole-Adams' vacant position in Jesselton was taken over by Alan Rice-Oxley.

Bond left Borneo on 14 January 1931 with his wife "on furlough prior to retirement." While the country expected him to stay-on until April, his wife was feeling unwell and they decided to return to England. The Company allowed him to "officially" retire in April to gain his full 30 years for pension. After his official retirement, Bond and his wife were gifted with a solid silver tea pot, milk jug and sugar basin, coffee pot, kettle, and an oval shaped tea tray with an inscription.

== Dates of Rank ==
Rank	Date	Unit	Ref.
Cadet	28 Apr 1901	British North Borneo Constabulary	
Wing Officer	1 Jan 1902	British North Borneo Constabulary	
Lieutenant	20 Mar 1903	British North Borneo Constabulary	
Captain	19 Oct 1906	British North Borneo Constabulary	
Acting Commandant	21 May 1907	British North Borneo Constabulary	
Adjutant	2 Jan 1909	British North Borneo Constabulary	
Chief Police Officer	15 Nov 1913	British North Borneo Constabulary	
Sub-Commandant	1 Jan 1914	British North Borneo Constabulary	
Acting Commandant	26 Apr 1916	British North Borneo Constabulary	
Major	28 Jun 1917	British North Borneo Constabulary	
Acting Commandant	16 Jan 1922	British North Borneo Constabulary	
Sub-Commandant	27 Oct 1923	British North Borneo Constabulary	
Commandant	1 June 1926	North Borneo Armed Constabulary	
Lieutenant Colonel	15 Sep 1926	North Borneo Armed Constabulary	

== Personal life ==
Bond married Ida Rose Maxwell in 1907. After moving to Borneo, Ida was involved in the amateur theatre.

In 1912, Bond led the funeral procession for James Scott Mason.

In 1926, as Bond was in preparations to become the Commandant of the Constabulary at Jesselton, the British North Borneo Herald noted that he was a keen golfer. Captain Cole-Adams, had been taking care of the Jesselton Golf Course, but he had to move to Sandakan.

In 1919, Bond worked with D'Oyly John to put on a series of crickett matches in Sandakan, and repaired the cricket grounds there.

In October 1926, Bond and his wife were instrumental in setting up amateur theatre productions in Jesselton. Their first play was a rendition of Arabian Nights. In 1928, Bond performed the character of Lord Grenham in the play Aren't We All?, and his wife played the character of Angela Lynton.

In 1928, Bond's only daughter, Barbara Maxwell, married Charles Douglas Round-Turner. Round-Turner, himself, was a member of the Constabulary.
