= Silimpopon Riots =

Conflict between Chinese coal miners in Borneo (1921)

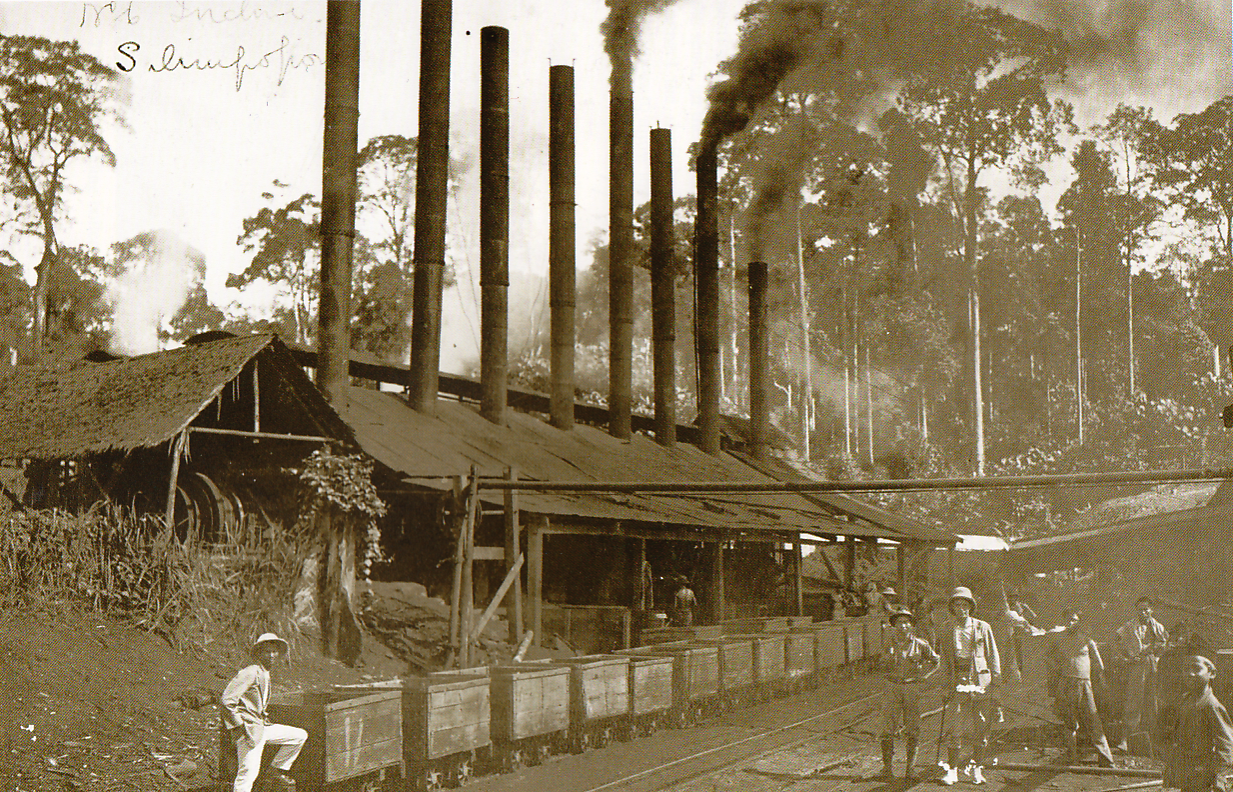
- Main boiler house at Silimpopon
- Date: 21 February 1921 – 2 March 1921
- Location: Silimpopon, Kalabakan District, North Borneo; 4.332204°N 117.454820°E

Parties
Lonkchunese Hakka coal miners	Cantonese coal miners	Cowie Harbour Coal Company British North Borneo Constabulary

Casualties
- Deaths: 12 killed
- Injuries: 5 wounded from gunfire
- Damage: 17 buildings burned, 2 destroyed
- Detained: 300

The Silimpopon Riots were a series of armed conflicts in February 1921 that broke out between two warring factions of Chinese coal miners at Silimpopon, the largest coal mine in the world at the time.

== History ==
In February 1921, two major battles broke out between the Lonkchunese (localized term for Hakka people) and Cantonese factions of the Chinese labour community at the colliery town of Silimpopon, roughly 80 miles to the west of Tawau. Silimpopon was at that time the largest coal mine in the world, and at its height had a population of over 3,000 people, with its own police station.

On February 21, 200 Chinese coal miners rioted at the number six incline.

On February 22, 600 more Chinese workers rioted at the number one incline. They used "dragon displays," shooting fireworks at each other, and beating each other over the head with blunt objects.

The Silimpopon police station was commanded by British North Borneo Constabulary officer Reginald Rutter. The mining boss, Mr. Magowan, from the Cowie Harbour Coal Company met Rutter at the police station to discuss a course of action. Rutter ordered his officers to fire at the crowd, aiming at their feet. Five people were wounded in the legs.

They fought each other with smashed beer bottles and other glass objects, sharpened iron bars, sharpened poles, and axes. The workers then raided the town, where they burned down fifteen small buildings. They threw sticks of dynamite that had been turned into homemade grenades, stuffed into glass bottles with bits of sharp metal and glass as fragmentation. Overall, several hundred of these grenades were thrown over the course of the two days.

Constabulary reinforcements were despatched by telegram from Sandakan, commanded by Commandant Major Henry Stanley Bond. By March 2, work had resumed at the site. The East Coast Resident arrived soon after to begin an investigation.
