= Alan Rice-Oxley =

Flying ace and police chief (1896–1961)

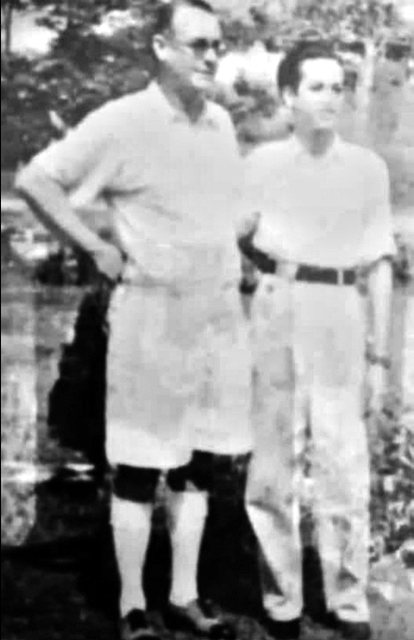
- Rice-Oxley with his son.

Commandant of the North Borneo Armed Constabulary
- In office September 1942 – January 1943
- Appointed by: Charles Robert Smith
- Preceded by: Wilfrid Carne Cole-Adams
- Succeeded by: Lionel Matthews

Personal details
- Born: Alan Rice Oxley; 1 July 1896 Kings Langley, Hertfordshire, England
- Died: 21 July 1961 (aged 65)
- Resting place: St Mary Magdalene churchyard, Loders, Dorset, England; 50°44′44.8″N 2°43′19.6″W
- Awards: Distinguished Flying Cross

Military service
- Allegiance: United Kingdom
- Branch/service: British Army; Royal Air Force
- Years of service: 1914–1921
- Rank: Lieutenant
- Unit: London Regiment (1st Surrey Rifles); The King's (Shropshire Light Infantry); No. 15 Squadron RFC; No. 41 Squadron RFC; No. 45 Squadron RAF
- Battles/wars: World War II; Western Front; Italian Front; World War II

Lieutenant Alan Rice-Oxley (1 July 1896 – 21 July 1961) was a British pilot during World War I. He became a flying ace in 1918, credited with six aerial victories.

== Early life ==
He was born as Alan Rice Oxley in Kings Langley, Hertfordshire on 1 July 1896. His parents were Edward Charles Rice Oxley (c. 1854 – 14 Mar 1927) and Emily Armstrong His parents had married in Shrewsbury on 14 January 1896. This was his father's second marriage, his father's first wife, Ann Eliza Hall (c. 1857 – 1894) had borne 5 children and Rice was the middle child of three from the second marriage. Rice-Oxley was educated at Watford Grammar School for Boys, which he attended between January 1908 and July 1914.

== Military career ==
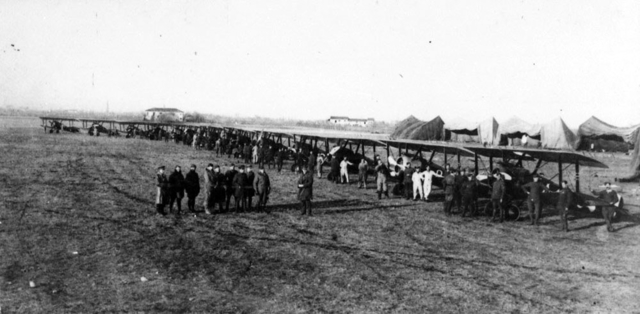
Sopwith Camels of No. 45 Squadron RFC at an airfield in Italy, December 1917.

Rice-Oxley first served as a private in the 21st (County of London) Battalion, The London Regiment (1st Surrey Rifles), until 5 February 1915 when he was commissioned as a second lieutenant in the 4th Battalion, The King's (Shropshire Light Infantry).

He was seconded for duty with the Royal Flying Corps, and appointed a flying officer on 10 September 1916. He trained as a pilot and initially served with No. 15 Squadron in France, tasked with artillery-spotting and reconnaissance. He was wounded in action during the Battle of the Somme in October 1916, and after recuperating became a fighter pilot. He was promoted to lieutenant on 1 July 1917. Subsequently, in 1918 he joined the Sopwith Camel equipped No. 45 Squadron on the Italian Front. He recorded his first victories in a combat on 12 July 1918. Piloting Camel D8240, he and Captain Cedric Howell engaged a formation of between ten and fifteen Austro-Hungarian aircraft in proximity to the town of Feltre. In the ensuing dogfight Rice-Oxley destroyed two of the enemy, and for his conduct in this action was awarded the Distinguished Flying Cross. Over the course of the following three days, he destroyed another enemy aircraft and drove a further two down out of control. On 16 August he was appointed a flight commander with the temporary rank of captain, and achieved his sixth and final victory on 22 August.

Rice-Oxley was transferred to the RAF's unemployed list on 26 March 1919, and relinquished his commission in the King's Shropshire Light Infantry on 30 September 1921.

== Later life ==
In 1921 Rice-Oxley emigrated to North Borneo to join the North Borneo Armed Constabulary, and was appointed as an officer of Class B in the following year, with the rank of captain. His duties included showing visitors around and, in 1926, while motoring with the author Somerset Maugham, Rice-Oxley came across a 13-foot (4-metre) snake and killed it with his malacca cane. He was appointed Superintendent of Police, Adjutant, and Superintendent of Prisons, in Jesselton in 1929. His career continued apace and he attained the position of Commandant of the Constabulary. On 12 November 1936 he officially changed his name from Alan Rice Oxley to Alan Rice-Oxley by deed poll.

In early 1937 he married Valerie Helen Gardner. Valerie was the widow of a fellow former RAF officer, Herbert Gardner, who had left the RAF in 1926 to move to the Federated Malay States, but was killed in Marseille in 1929. After their marriage the coupled sailed in May 1937 from London on the P&O SS Ranchi; after the outbreak of the second World War the couple returned to England; later during the war Valerie remained in England when Rice-Oxley returned to North Borneo.

From September 1942 to January 1943, Rice-Oxley was interned by the administration of Japanese Borneo at Berhala Island, where in his duties as the Commandant of the Constabulary, he led an active intelligence network and resistance against the Japanese occupation. In January, Rice-Oxley was moved to Batu Lintang camp near Kuching, Sarawak. He passed the title of Commandant on to Lionel Matthews.

Post-war, he returned to Britain and was working as a dairy farmer at Knowle Farm, Uploders, Dorset, when he died on 21 July 1961. He is buried in the churchyard of St. Mary Magdalene, Loders, Dorset.

== Honours and awards ==
Distinguished Flying Cross
Lt. Alan Rice-Oxley (Shrops. L.I.).

"In company with another machine this officer attacked an enemy formation of fifteen aeroplanes, and promptly destroyed two of them. He then repeatedly attacked the remaining thirteen machines, who were crowding on his companion, and the battle ended in the destruction of six of the enemy and one driven down out of control. Two days afterwards he destroyed two more enemy aircraft. The gallantry displayed by this officer, and that of his companion, Capt. C. E. Howell, in attacking fifteen machines, was of the very highest order."

== Bibliography ==
- Shores, Christopher F.; Franks, Norman & Guest, Russell F. (1990). Above the Trenches: a Complete Record of the Fighter Aces and Units of the British Empire Air Forces 1915–1920. London, UK: Grub Street. ISBN 978-0-948817-19-9.
- Watford Grammar School (2002). A Book of Remembrance 1914–1918. Uckfield, England: Naval and Military Press. ISBN 978-1-84342-424-6.
