= Jock McLaren =

Australian army officer

Robert Kerr McLaren
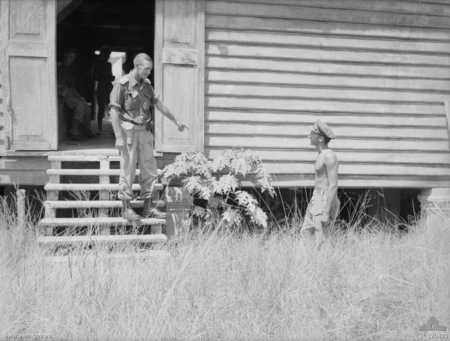
- Jock McLaren (at left), in October 1945, indicating to another officer where he slept under a hut when he was a prisoner of war on Berhala Island.
- Born: Robert Kerr McLaren; April 27, 1902; Kirkcaldy, Scotland
- Died: March 3, 1956 (aged 53); Wau, New Guinea
- Relatives: James Bryce McLaren (Father); Annie Maxwell (née Kerr) (Mother)
- Military career
- Allegiance: United Kingdom; Australia
- Branch: British Army; Australian Army
- Service years: ? — 1918; 1941 — 1946
- Rank: Captain
- Nickname: Jock
- Conflicts: World War I; World War II; Malayan campaign; Guerrilla warfare, Mindanao; Borneo campaign
- Awards: Military Cross & Bar; Mentioned in Despatches

Robert Kerr "Jock" McLaren MC & Bar (27 April 1902 – 3 March 1956) was a decorated Australian Army officer, who rose from enlisted rank and was noted for his involvement in guerrilla operations against the Japanese during World War II.

== Early life ==
McLaren was born on 27 April 1902 in Kirkcaldy, Scotland. His father was James Bryce McLaren, a chemist, while his mother was Annie Maxwell (née Kerr).

== Military career ==
=== World War I ===
During World War I, McLaren served in the British Army with the 51st Highland Division. After the war he moved to Queensland, Australia where he served as a veterinary officer in Bundaberg. In 1938, he married Catherine Ahern in Childers.

=== World War II ===
Following the outbreak of World War II, he continued to serve as a veterinary officer, although he joined the Citizens Military Force in March 1941. Shortly after, he volunteered for overseas service and opted to transfer to the Australian Imperial Force. He was assigned to the 2/10th Australian Field Workshops with the 8th Australian Division in British Malaya when Singapore fell to the Japanese army. At this time, he was thirty-nine years old.

He could not endure imprisonment and immediately organized an escape party. Escaping from the POW camp with two comrades, they successfully made it almost to Kuala Lumpur, often with the aid of Malayan Chinese and Chinese communist guerrillas, before they were betrayed to the Japanese by Malays. It was during this escape that McLaren began to hate the Japanese as he passed the bodies of hundreds of Chinese men, women and children, who had been tortured, raped, and then killed by Japanese occupation forces.

Imprisoned once again, McLaren sought to escape from the Singapore prison camps. He managed to add himself to a contingent of prisoners being sent to Borneo to a labour camp. Once he arrived at Berhala Island, in Sandakan Harbour on northeastern Borneo, he began, with several other prisoners, to plan an escape. Hearing that they were to be sent to a more permanent camp at Sandakan with less opportunity for escape, they moved up their escape and, stealing a boat from a nearby leper colony, they set off to the Tawi Tawi islands where they were told other Australians were fighting as guerrillas. On their arrival, they soon made contact with Filipino guerrillas, who assisted McLaren and six others to make contact, in June 1943, with the guerrilla organization on Mindanao. Their escape from Berhala Island saved their lives as they then missed the early 1945 Sandakan Death Marches.

Eventually, McLaren and his comrades arrived on Mindanao where they made contact with American and Filipino guerrillas under the overall command of Lieutenant Colonel Wendell Fertig. Their hopes of returning to Australia to join formal army units were curtailed due to the need for experienced leaders for the guerrilla forces and lack of transportation. Eventually, some of the party were sent to Australia by submarine.

Surprisingly, McLaren wished to remain behind, as transfer to a formal unit would not only inhibit his actions and desire for revenge, but his age would preclude participation in combat. Except for a short leave in Australia toward the end of the war, he spent most of the war years serving as a coastwatcher and guerrilla leader. He participated in numerous raids on the Japanese, sometimes in command of small, heavily armed, coastal vessels. At one time, he radioed information on a ship carrying 3,000 Japanese troops to another island. Most of the troops were killed or drowned when American submarines sank the ship. The rest were killed by Filipinos as the Japanese survivors reached shore exhausted and in no condition to fight. McLaren's numerous land and sea guerrilla actions so disrupted Japanese operations that eventually the Japanese placed a reward of 70,000 pesos on McLaren's head.

In August 1944 he conducted an appendectomy on himself without anaesthesia of any kind, using only a pocket knife and a mirror. He then proceeded to suture himself with what he had on hand - "jungle fibre".

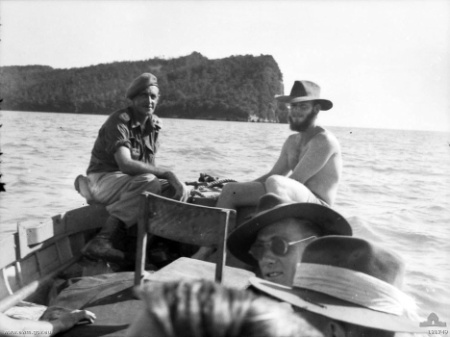
Jock McLaren (at left) returning to Berhala Island in October 1945.

During one period of his service in the Philippines, McLaren commandeered a 26-foot whaleboat that he called The Bastard. McLaren and his crew often used surprise to their advantage, entering Japanese-controlled ports in broad daylight, to fire at supply vessels and piers with machine guns and a mortar, before retreating.

As senior officers at both the guerrilla unit and army levels began to appreciate his initiative and dependability, he was often assigned to make small unit and solo forays into Japanese held areas for intelligence. Toward the end of the war, high-level U.S. and Australian commands relied on him to penetrate Japanese areas in the Philippines and former Dutch colonies ahead of planned invasions for the latest intelligence and to scout possible enemy routes of retreat which could then be interdicted. As a member of the American forces in the Philippines, McLaren was under U.S. command. However, on 20 April 1945, upon the request of the Australians who had a need for his talents, General Robert L. Eichelberger personally signed an order releasing McLaren back to Australian command.

After being transferred to Z Special Unit, under the command of the Services Reconnaissance Department, attached to the Allied Intelligence Bureau, McLaren subsequently took part in an airborne operation near Balikpapan in late June 1945. Dropping in advance of the main Allied landing in early July 1945, McLaren led a section of four men on a reconnaissance mission. Despite losing two men, one from injury following the landing and another in an ambush, McLaren and the other two men were able to return to Australian lines on 6 July and report the Japanese dispositions to the Australian 7th Division's headquarters. Following this, in late July, McLaren took part in an operation on British North Borneo, leading an eight-man section. It was his last operation of the war, and after hostilities he remained in Borneo to help re-establish administration before being returned to Australia in November 1945.

Having been promoted to sergeant soon after joining the guerrilla forces, Jock McLaren later received a field commission from Australia and ended the war with the substantive rank of captain. During the course of his service, McLaren was decorated with the Military Cross twice for his heroic actions, as well as being Mentioned in Despatches.

== Later life ==
Following the end of the war, McLaren was discharged from the AIF and transferred to the Reserve Officers List in early 1946. Following this he became a government veterinarian in New Guinea. He remained in this role until 1956 when he began growing coffee, buying a plantation at Wau. On 3 March 1956, McLaren was accidentally killed near his home, after he backed a vehicle against a dead tree, and timber fell on him.
