= Charter Day (North Borneo) =

Public holiday in North Borneo (1882–1942)

- Type: Public Holiday
- Date: 1st
- Frequency: Annual
- Last time: 1942
- Started by: North Borneo Chartered Company

Charter Day was an official public holiday in the country of North Borneo which was celebrated from 1882 to 1942. Charter Day officially commemorated the signing of the royal charter which granted rights to the North Borneo Chartered Company to become the sole governing authority over the country at the Northeastern tip of the island of Borneo. The day was celebrated each year on 1 November with a parade, an inspection of the troops of the British North Borneo Constabulary, boat races, horse races, and other events.
