= Berhala Island, Sabah =

Island in Malaysia

Berhala Island
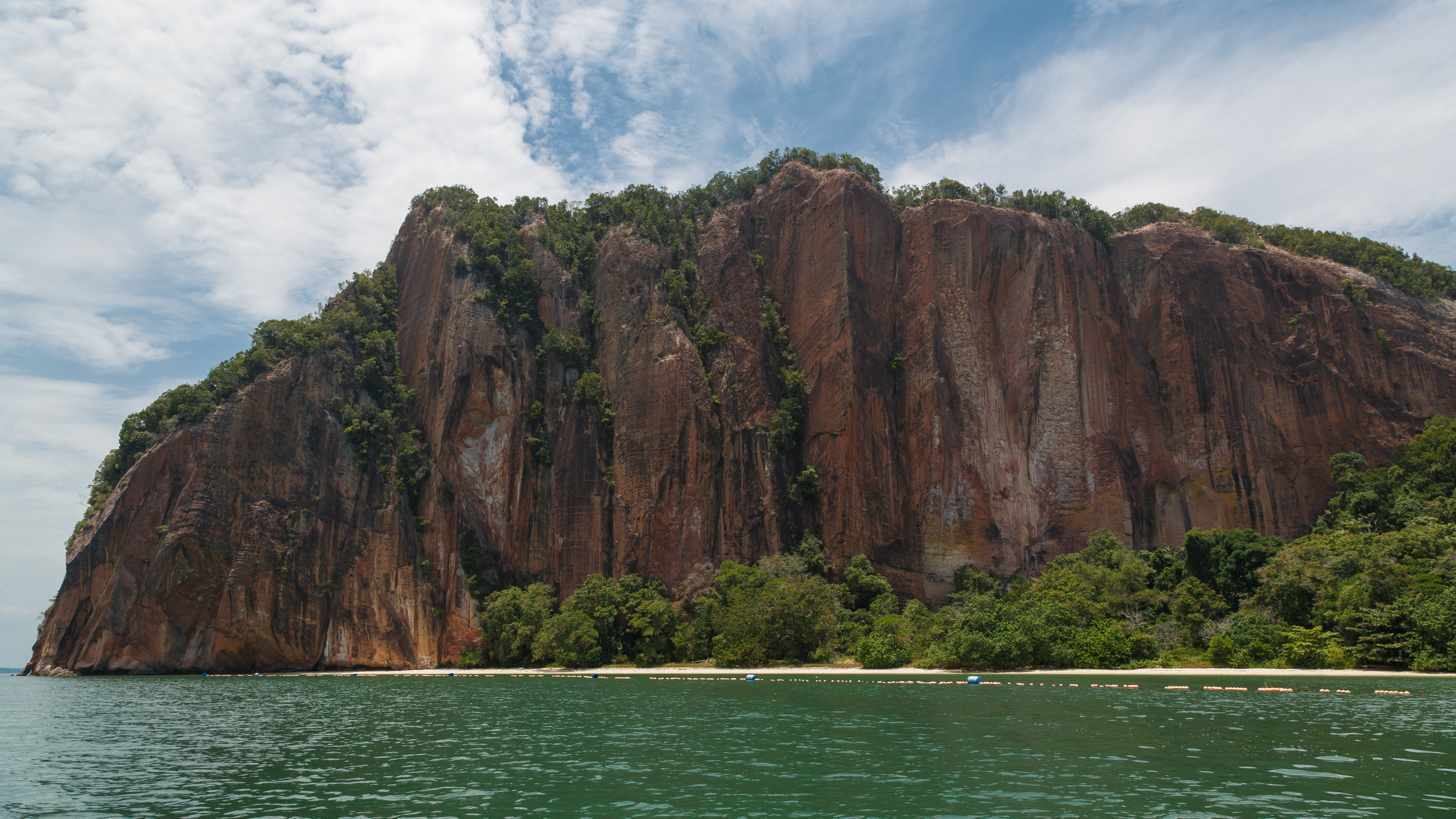
- The massive "Rock of Pulau Berhala," seen from the sea side
- Interactive map of Berhala Island

Geography
- Coordinates: 5°52′11.8″N 118°08′37.8″E

Administration
- Malaysia
- State: Sabah
- Division: Sandakan
- District: Sandakan

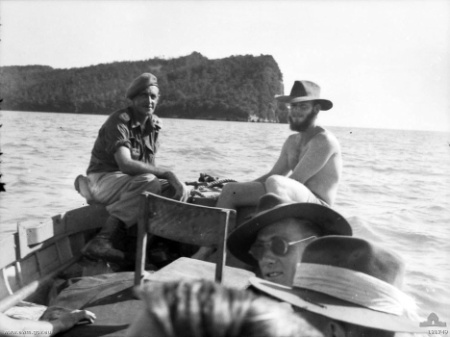
Jock McLaren, one of the POWs who escaped from Berhala Island in World War II, returning there after the war. The high cliffs of the northern end of the island are visible.

Berhala Island (Malay: Pulau Berhala) is a small forested island situated in Sandakan Bay in Sandakan, Sabah, Malaysia.

The island is approximately 5 hectares in size and has prominent cliffs at its northern end. Many birds of prey can be seen on and around Berhala, including brahminy kites, serpent eagles and sea eagles.

The island has a lighthouse at its highest point.

In the period prior to World War II, the island was used as a quarantine station for labourers coming from China and the Philippines, and was also home to a leper colony. During the war, civilian internees, including Agnes Newton Keith, her husband Harry Keith and Keith Wookey were held in the quarantine station which served as a makeshift internment camp, before being transferred to Batu Lintang camp in Kuching, Sarawak. After the civilians left, POWs were interned in the camp. A daring escape took place from Berhala Island in June 1943, when several POWs who were due to be transferred to Sandakan POW camp managed to escape to Tawi-Tawi in the Philippines.

Plans are currently in development to promote Berhala Island as a tourist attraction.

== See also ==
- List of islands of Malaysia
