= Sandakan =

Malaysian town

- Municipality and district capital
- Sandakan Town; Bandar Sandakan
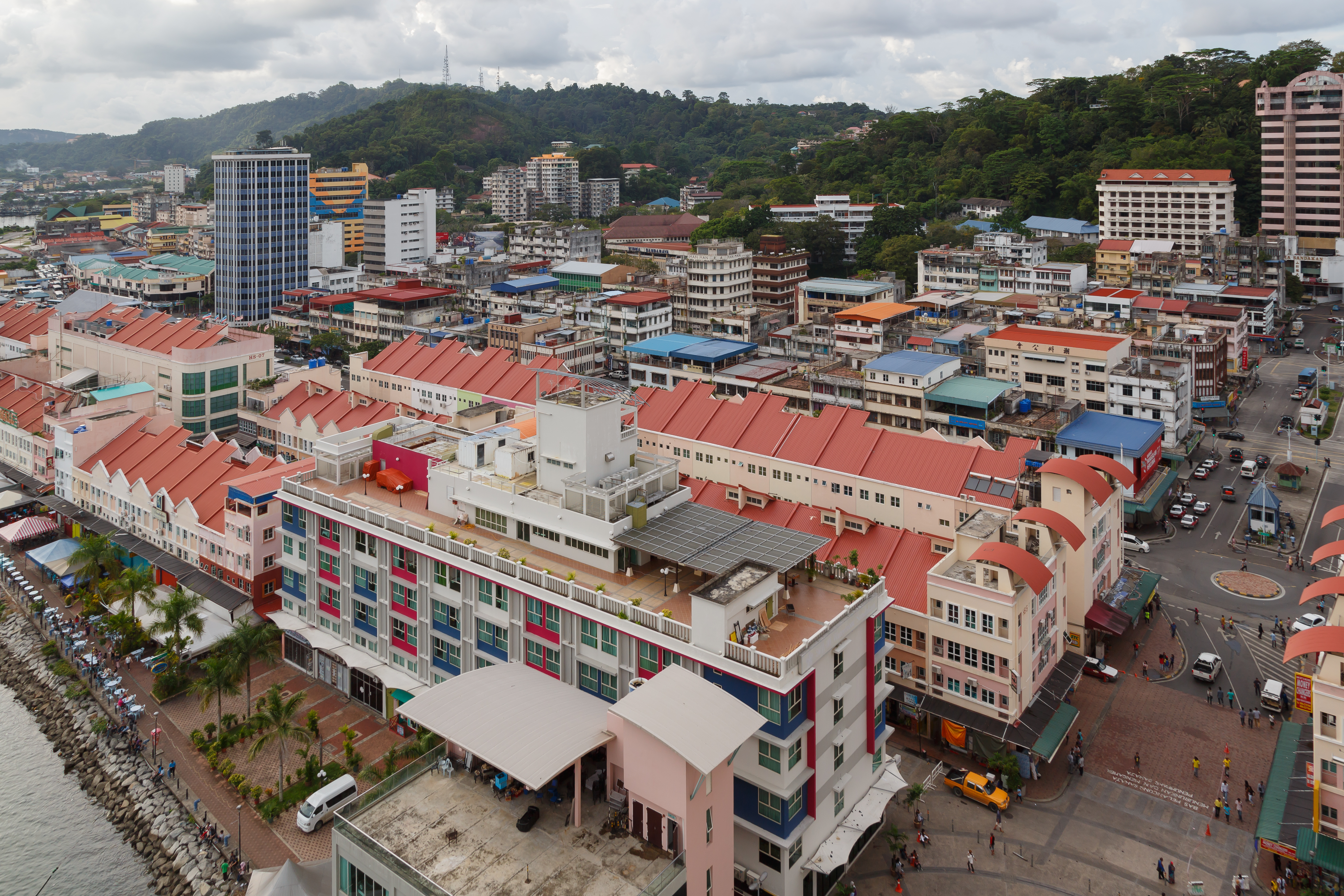
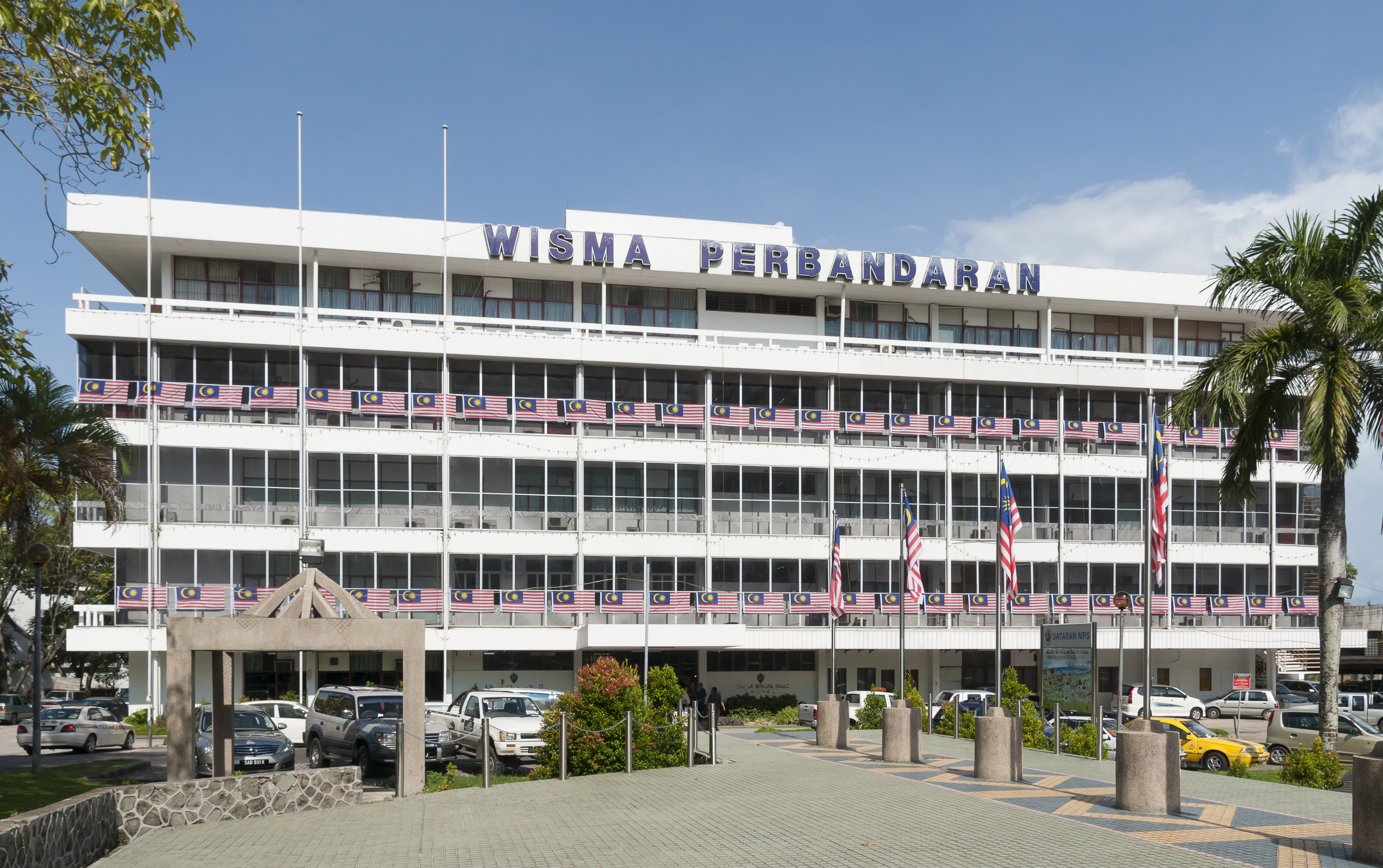
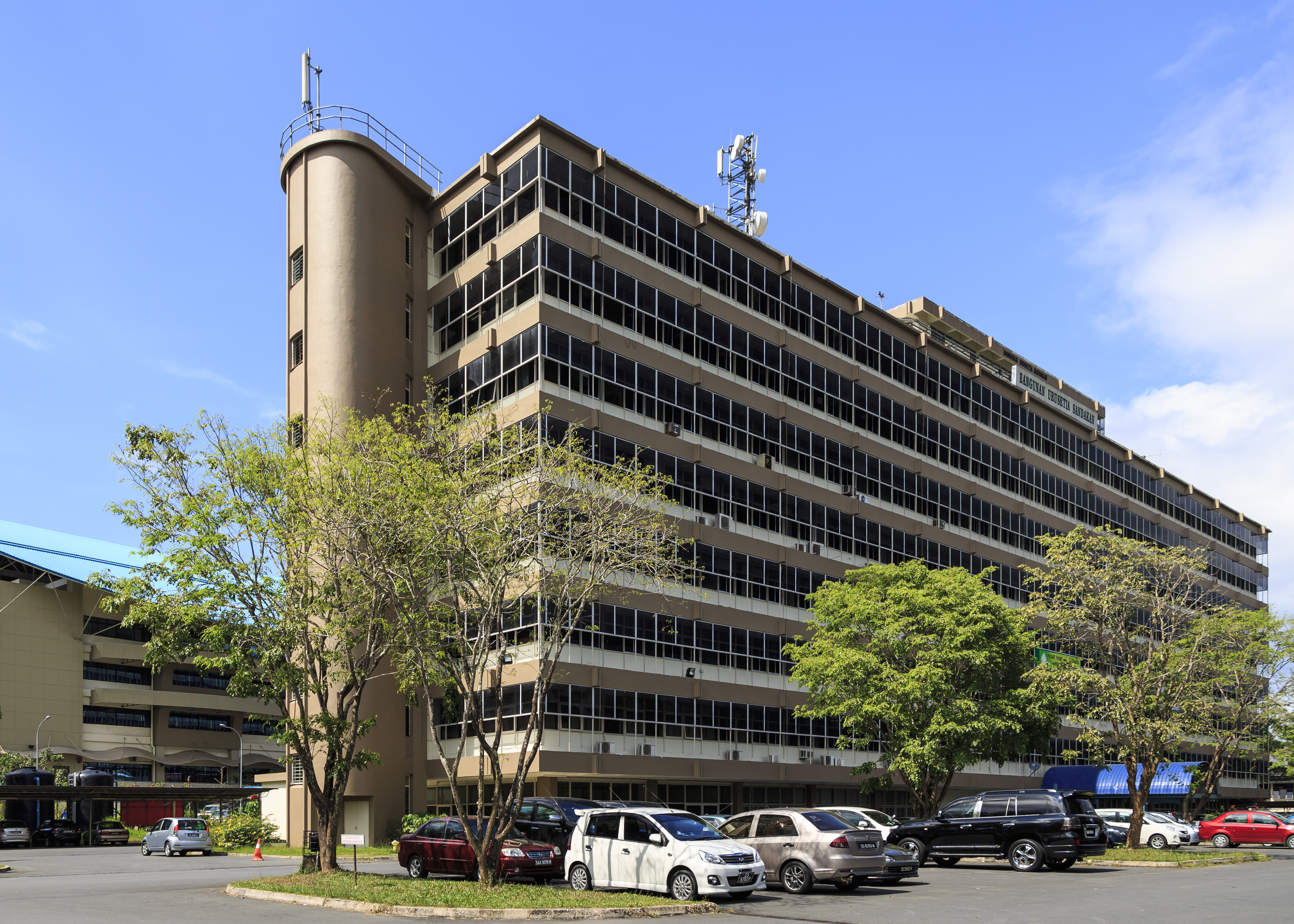
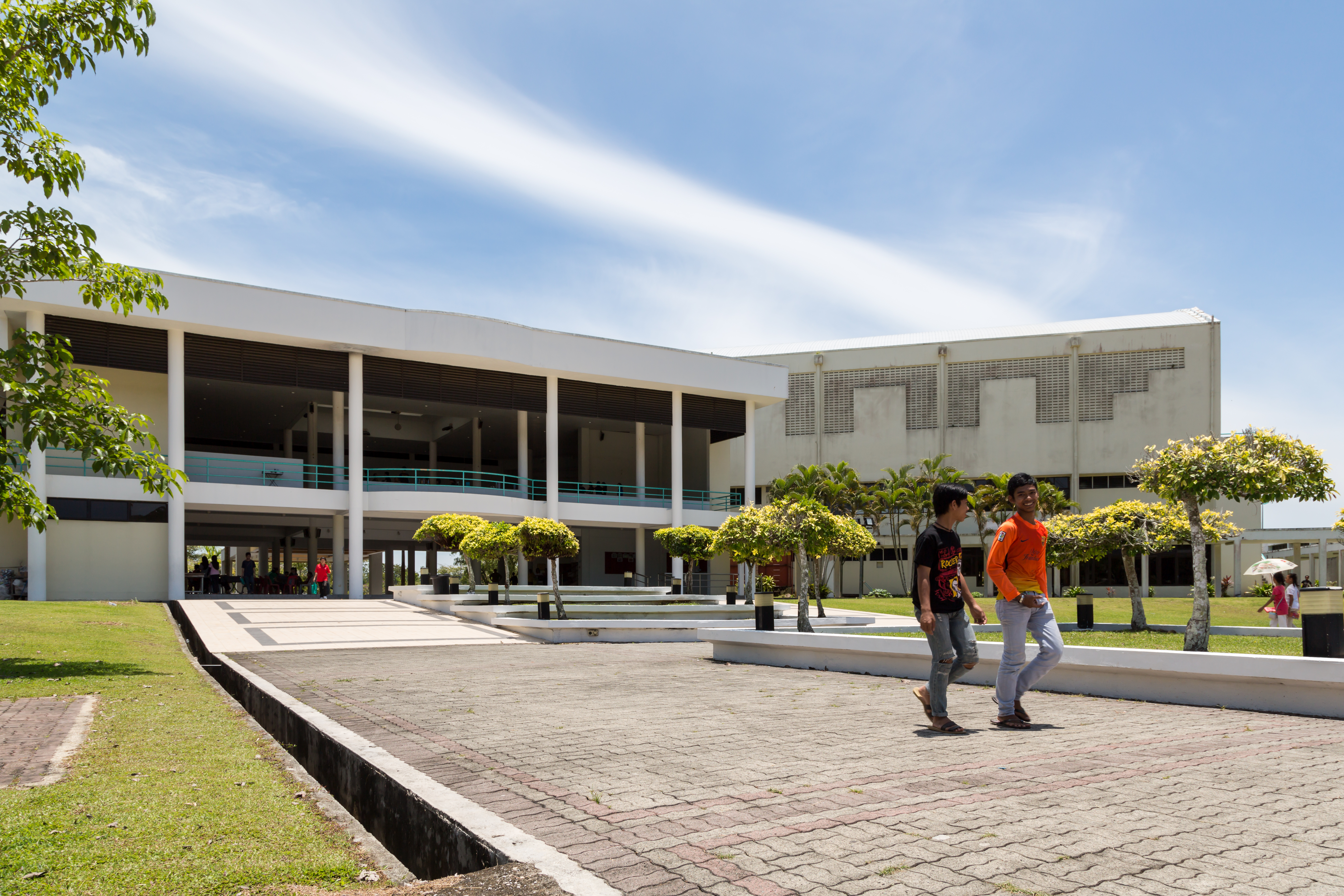
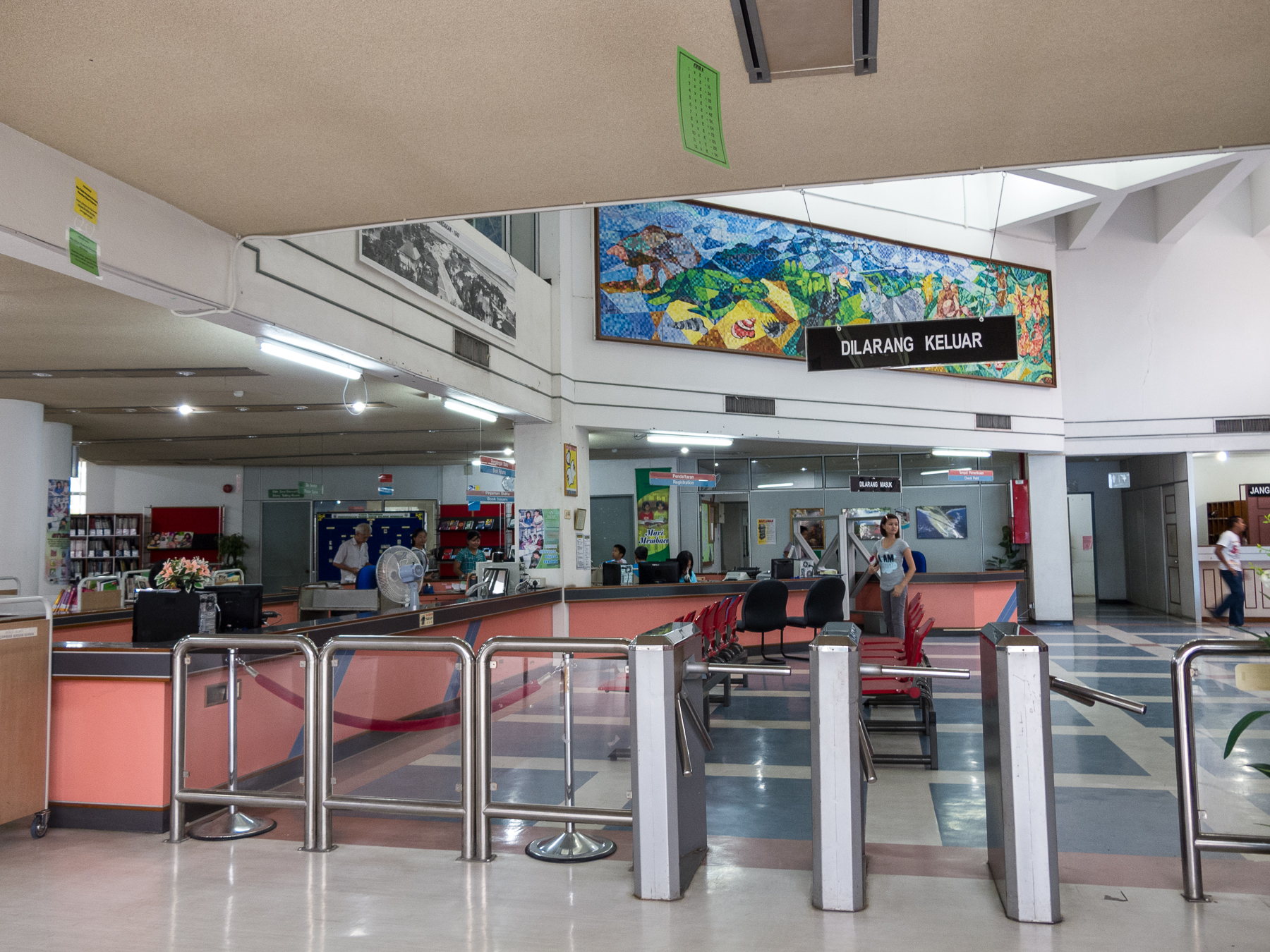
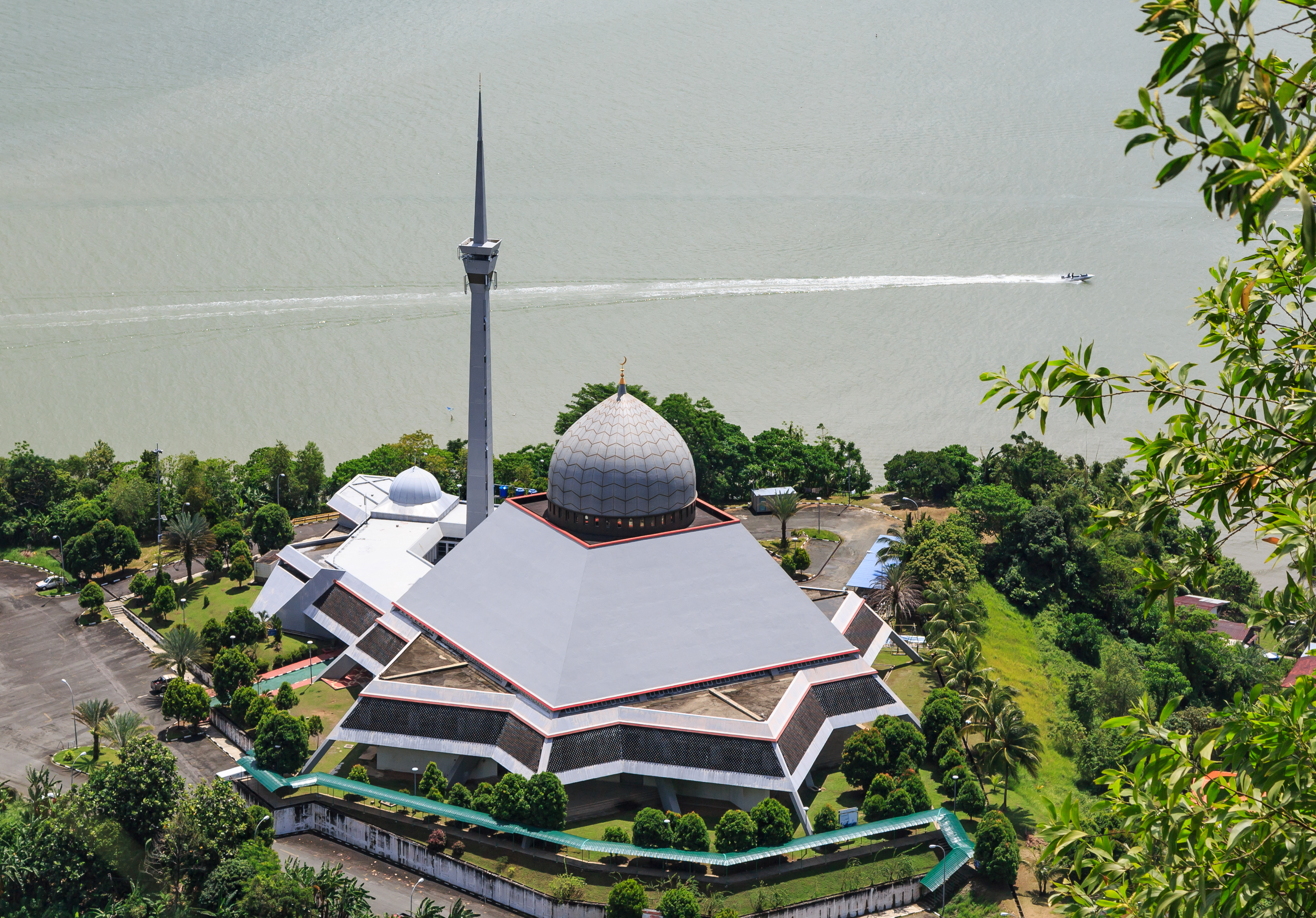
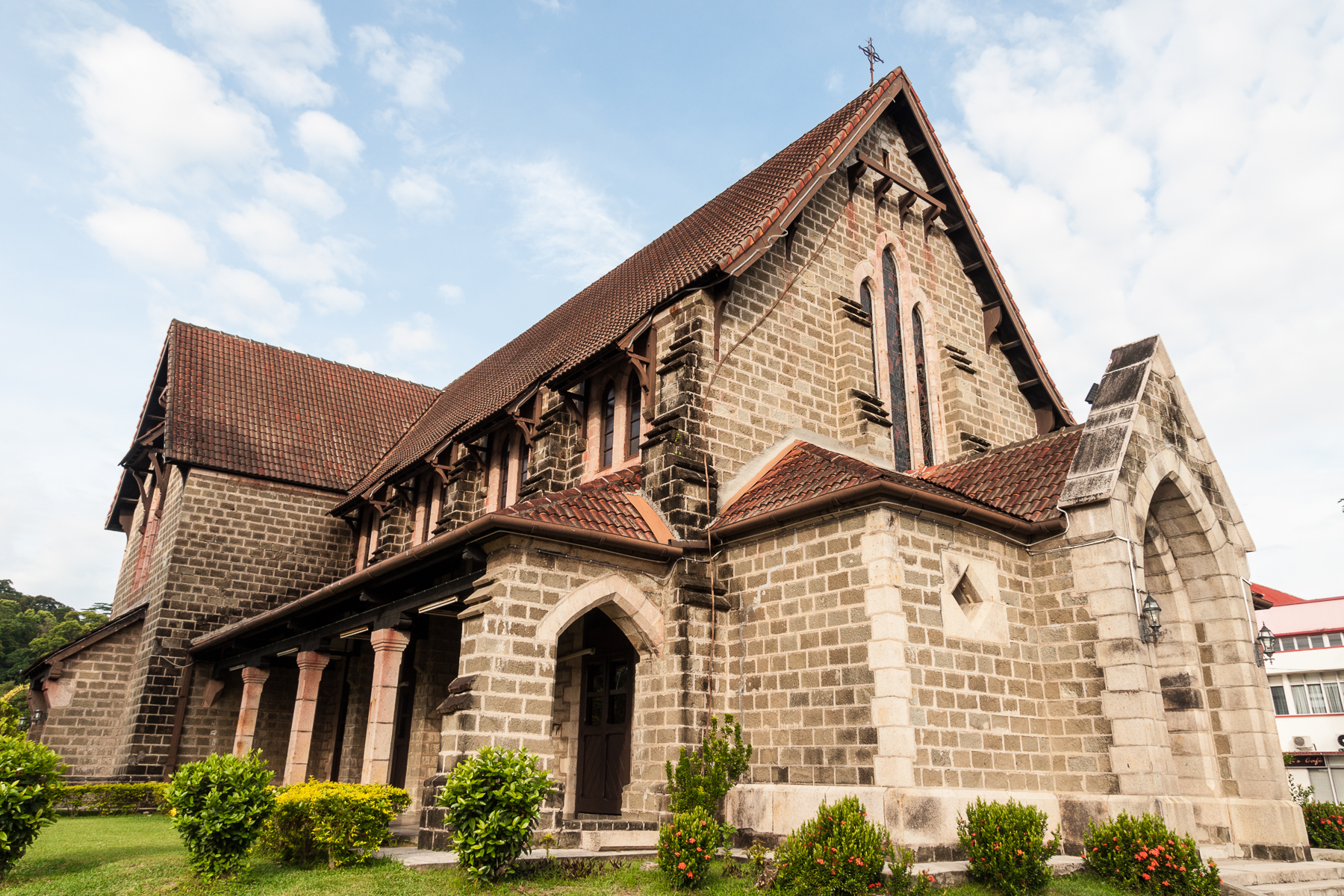
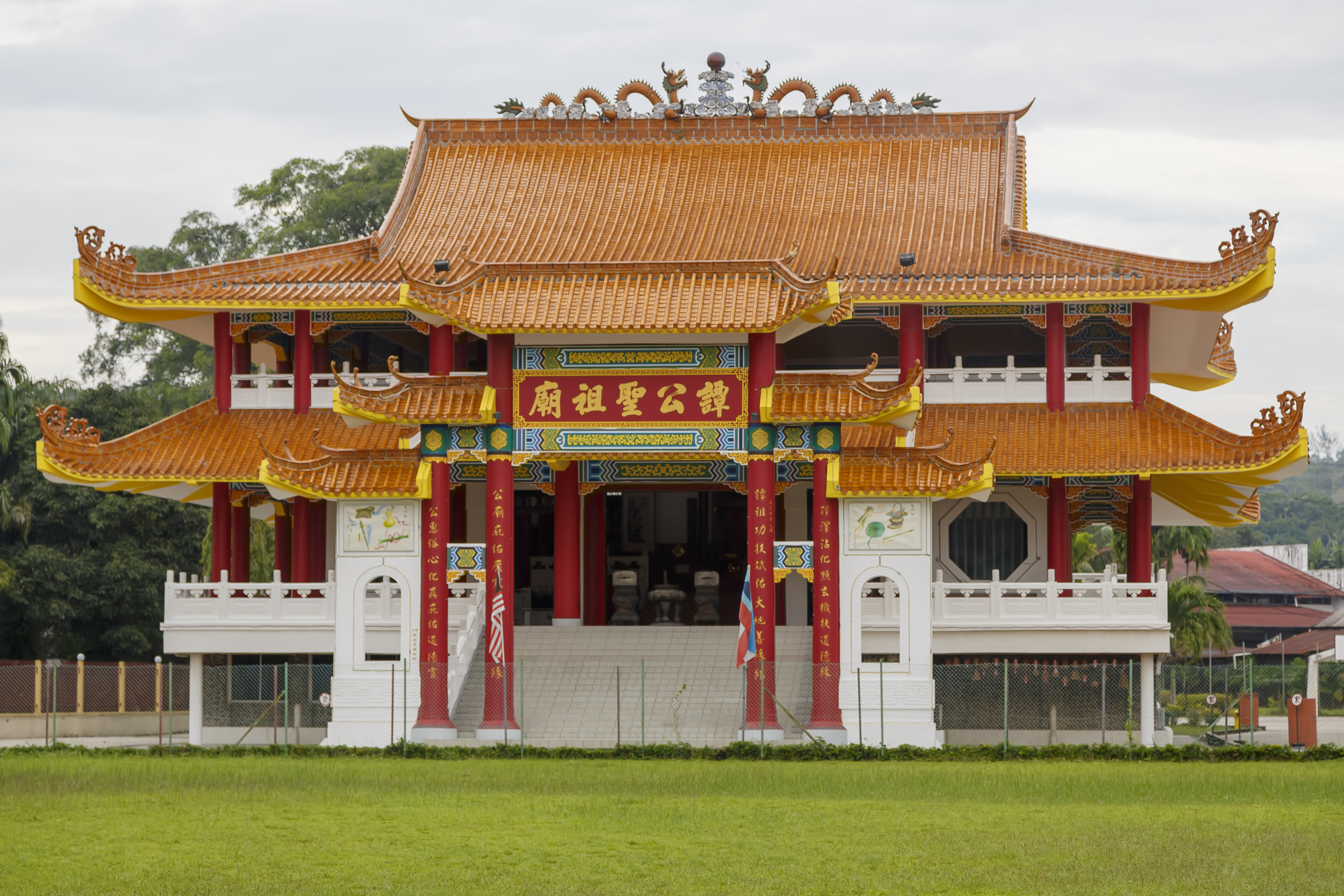
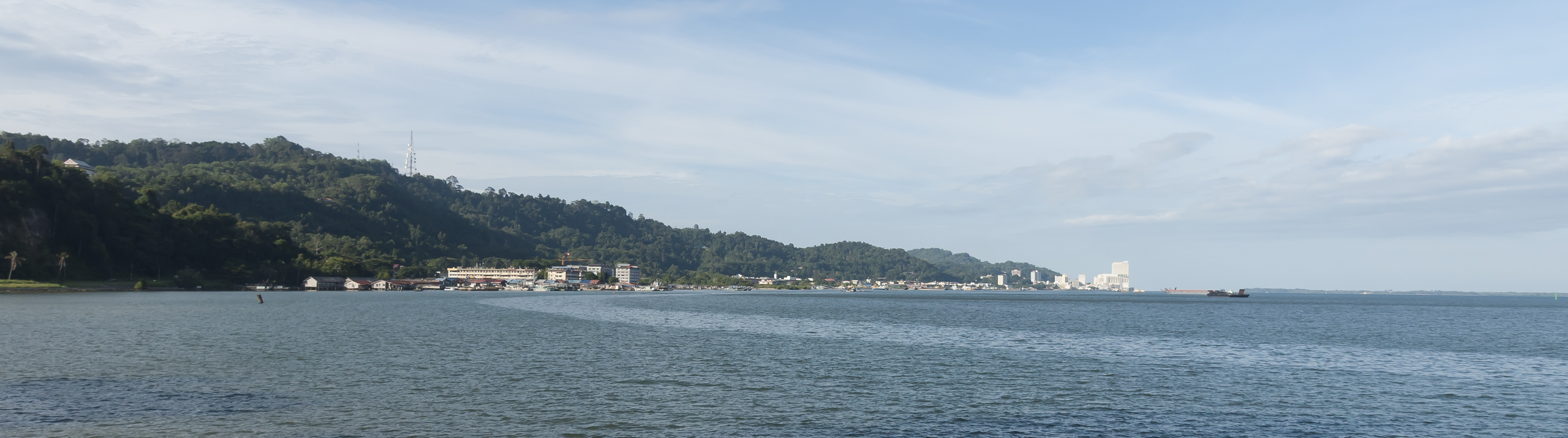
- From top, left to right: Sandakan city center, the Sandakan Municipal Council, the State Secretariat Building, Sandakan Sports Complex, the Sandakan Regional Library, the Sandakan District Mosque, the St. Michael's and All Angels Church, the Tam Kung Temple, and view of Sandakan Bay

- Seal
- Nicknames: The Nature City, Little Hong Kong
- Location of Sandakan in Sabah
- Sandakan in Sabah Sandakan in Malaysia Sandakan in Asia Sandakan in the Earth
- Coordinates: 05°50′0″N 118°07′0″E
- Country: Malaysia
- State: Sabah
- Division: Sandakan
- District: Sandakan
- Bruneian Empire: 15th century–1704
- Sultanate of Sulu: 1704–1882
- Settled by BNBC: 21 June 1879
- Declared capital of North Borneo: 1884
- Discontinuation as capital: 1946
- Municipality: 1 January 1982
- City: TBA

Government
  - Council President: Walter Kenson

Area
  - Total: 2,266 km^{2} (875 sq mi)
- Elevation: 10 m (33 ft)
- Lowest elevation: 0 m (0 ft)

Population (2020 Census)
  - Total: 439,050
  - Density: 193.8/km^{2} (501.8/sq mi)
- Time zone: UTC+8 (MST)
  - Summer (DST): Not observed
- Postal code: 90000 to 90999
- Area code(s): 089
- Vehicle registration: ES (1967-1980), SS(1980-2018), SM (2018-Present)
- Website: mps.sabah.gov.my/portal/

Sandakan (Malaysian: [ˈsandaˈkan]) formerly known at various times as Elopura, is the capital of the Sandakan District in Sabah, Malaysia. It is the second largest city in Sabah after Kota Kinabalu. It is located on the Sandakan Peninsula and east coast of the state in the administrative centre of Sandakan Division and was the former capital of British North Borneo. In 2010, the city had an estimated population of 157,330 while the overall municipal area had a total population of 396,290. The population of the municipal area had increased to 439,050 by the 2020 Census.

Before the founding of Sandakan, Sulu Archipelago was the source of dispute between Spain and the Sultanate of Sulu for economic dominance in the region. By 1864, Spain had blockaded the Sultanate possessions in the Sulu Archipelago. The Sultanate of Sulu awarded a German consular service ex-member a piece of land in the Sandakan Bay to seek protection from Germany. In 1878, the Sultanate sold north-eastern Borneo to an Austro-Hungarian consul who later left the territory to a British colonial merchant. The German presence over the area raised concern among the British. As a result, a protocol was signed between the British, German and the Spanish to recognise Spanish sovereignty over the Sulu Archipelago, in return for the Spanish not intervening in British affairs in northern Borneo.

Sandakan began to prosper when the British North Borneo Company (BNBC) started to build a new settlement in 1879, developing it into an active commercial and trading centre as well as making it the main administrative centre for North Borneo. The British also encouraged the migration of the Chinese from British Hong Kong to develop the economy of Sandakan. However, the prosperity halted when the Japanese occupied the area. As the war continued and Allied bombing started in 1944, the town was totally destroyed. Unable to fund the costs of the reconstruction, the administrative powers of North Borneo were handed over to the Crown Colony government. Subsequently, the administrative capital of North Borneo was moved to Jesselton. As part of the 1948–1955 Colonial Office Reconstruction and Development Plan, the crown colony government began to develop the fishing industry in Sandakan.

Sandakan is one of the main ports for oil, tobacco, coffee, sago, and timber exports. Other economic activities include fishing, ship building, eco-tourism, and manufacturing. Among the tourist attractions in Sandakan are Sandakan Heritage Museum, Sandakan Cultural Festival, Sandakan War Memorial, Sepilok Orang Utan Sanctuary, Turtle Islands National Park, and Gomantong Caves.

== Etymology ==
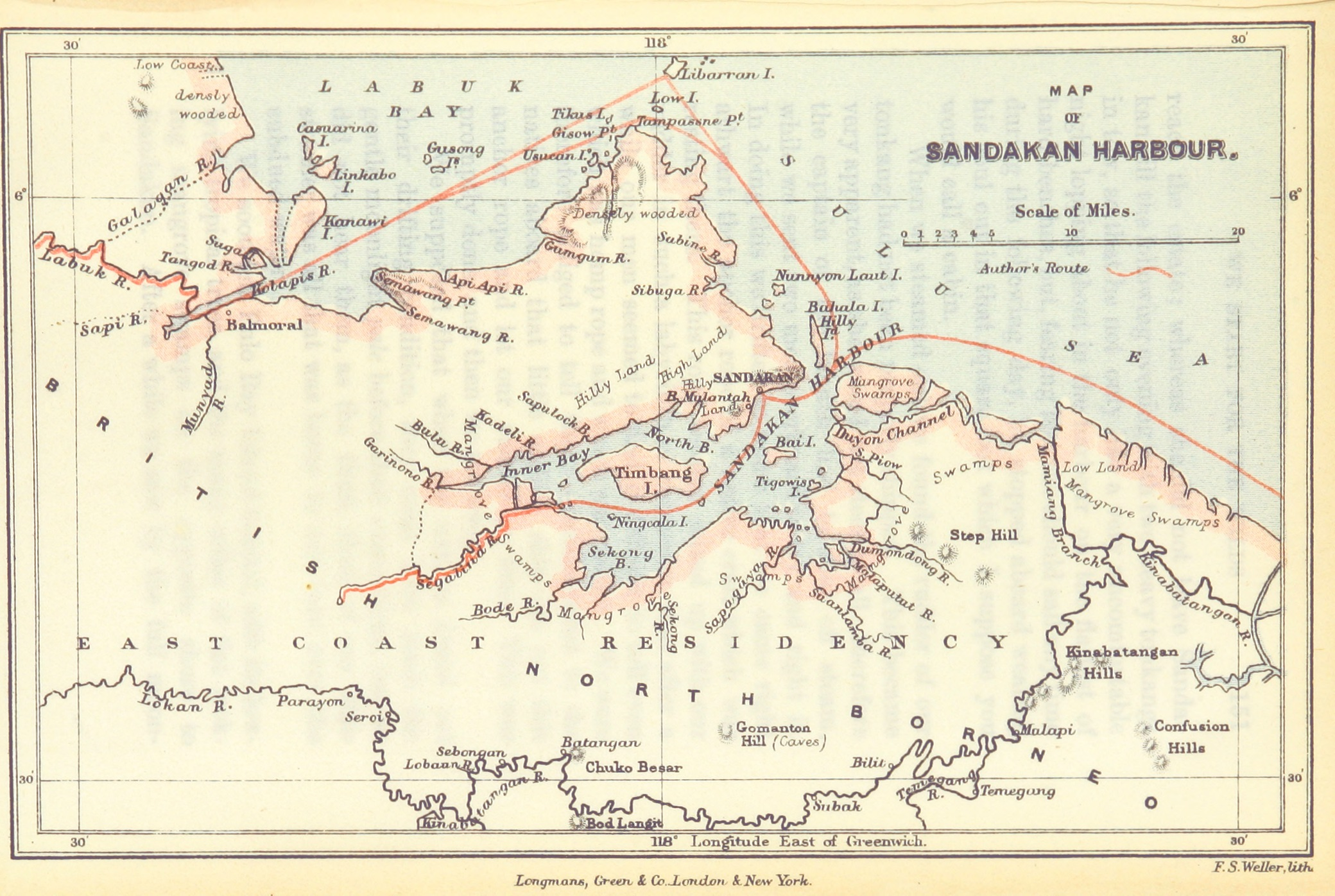
An 1891 Sandakan Harbour map, British Library catalogue.

A first European settlement was built by a Scottish arms smuggler from Glasgow named William Clark Cowie who named the settlement "Sandakan", (which in the Suluk language means "The place that was pawned"). It was soon renamed Kampong German (Kampung Jerman), due to the presence of several German bases there. When another new settlement was built shortly after the previous Cowie settlement had been destroyed by a fire, it was called as Elopura, meaning "beautiful town". The name was given by the British North Borneo Company but the locals persisted to use the old name and later it was changed back to Sandakan. Besides Elopura, it was also nicknamed Little Hong Kong due to a strong presence of ethnic Chinese migration from Hong Kong (mainly Cantonese and Hakka). It was Pryer who gave the settlement the name Elopura meaning "beautiful town". Several years later the settlement was again renamed Sandakan. The name Elopura, however, is still used for some local government functions of the Sabah State Legislative Assembly, including elections. The town is usually referred as "Sandakan" nowadays instead of "Elopura" or "Little Hong Kong". However, efforts have been made to develop Sandakan so that the town is fitting to have the name of "Little Hong Kong" again.

== History ==
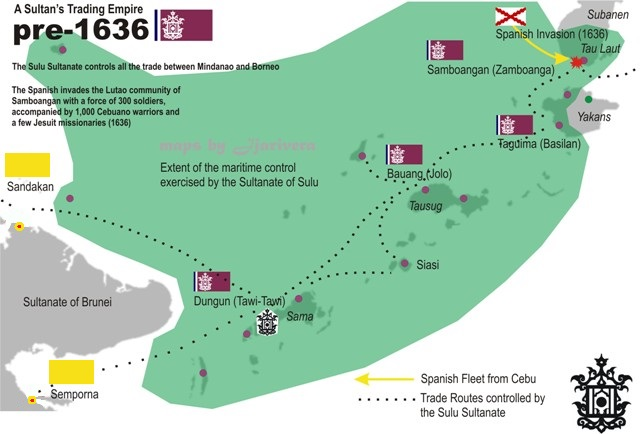
Pre-1636 Sulu Sultanate trading ranges, during which Sandakan is still a part of the Bruneian Empire.

Like most of Borneo, this area was once under the control of the Bruneian Empire in the 15th century before being ceded to the Sultanate of Sulu between the 17th and 18th centuries as a gift for helping the Bruneian forces during the Brunei Civil War. Since the 18th century, Sandakan start to be ruled by the Sultanate of Sulu. In 1855, when Spanish power began to expand in the Philippine archipelago, they began to restrict the trade of foreign nations with Sulu by establishing a port in Zamboanga and issuing a ruling which declared that ships wanting to engage in trade with the Sulu Archipelago must first visit the Spanish port. In 1860, the Sultanate of Sulu became important to the British as their archipelago could allow the British to dominate trade routes from Singapore to Mainland China. But in 1864, William Frederick Schuck, a German ex-member for the German consular service arrived in Sulu and met Sultan Jamal ul-Azam, who encouraged him to remain in Jolo. Schuck associated himself with the Singapore-German trading firm of Schomburg and began working in the interest of the Sultan and Datu Majenji, who was an overlord in the island of Tawi-Tawi. While he continued his voyage to Celebes, he decided to open his first headquarters at Jolo. Large quantities of arms, opium, textiles and tobacco from Singapore were shipped to Tawi-Tawi in exchange for slaves from the Sultanate.

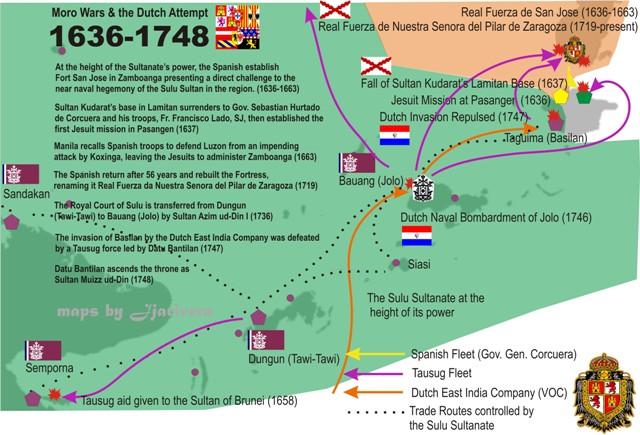
The beginning of Spanish–Moro conflict with several Dutch East India Company (VOC) invasion attempts.

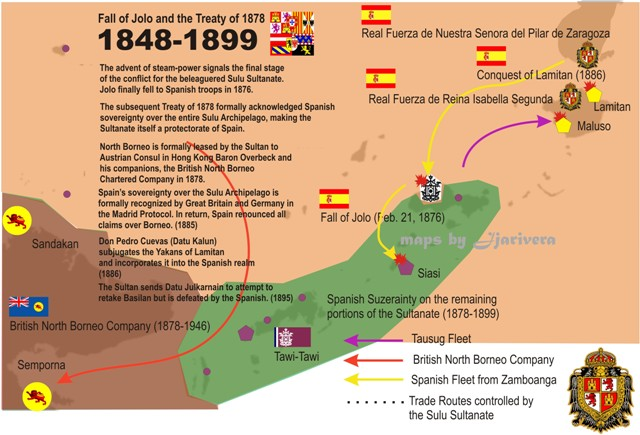
The arrival of British North Borneo Company (BNBC) and further expansion of Spanish fleet marking the end of the Sulu's rule in Sandakan as well other parts of eastern Sabah.

In November 1871, Spanish gunboats bombarded Samal villages in Tawi-Tawi islands and blockaded Jolo. As war in the waters of Sulu began to escalate, the Sultanate came to rely on Singapore's market for assistance. When the Sultanate increased their close trade relations with the British trading ports of Labuan and Singapore, this forced the Spanish to take another major step to conquer the Sulu Archipelago. The arrival of German warship SMS Nymphe at the Sulu Sea in 1872 to investigate the Sulu-Spanish conflict made the Sultanate believe Schuck was connected with the German government, thus the Sultanate granted Schuck an area of land in the Sandakan Bay to establish a trading port to monopolise the rattan trade in the northeast coast where Schuck could operate freely without the Spanish blockade. The intervention of Germans on the Sulu issue caught the British' attention and made them suspicious, especially when the Sultanate had asked for protection from them. Schuck then established warehouses and residences in the Sandakan Bay, along with the arrival of two steamers under the German flag and it served as a base for the running of gunpowder and firearms. When another German warship SMS Hertha visited Sandakan Bay, its commander described the activity in Kampung Jerman:

... during our stay, two small steamers under German flag, ostensibly coming from Labuan, ran in; also third, of about the same size, with a flag of all yellow, the property and flag, as I was told of the Datu Alum. Judging from the stores in the settlement, cotton goods, arms and especially firearms, appears to be the articles of trade with the natives of Sulu.

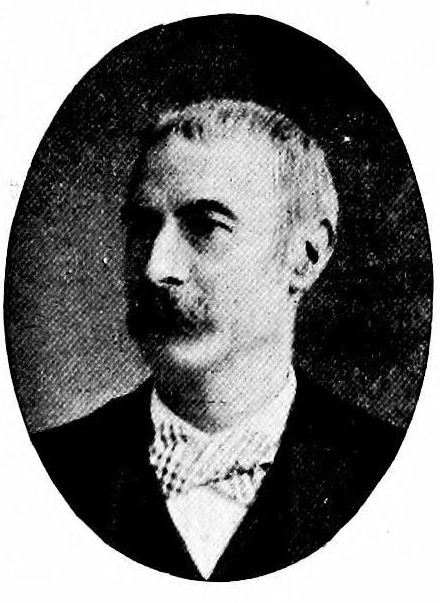
William B. Pryer is the first British resident of Sandakan.

In 1875, an Austro-Hungarian consul named Baron von Overbeck purchased the rights to a defunct American trading company in Borneo. After efforts by Overbeck to sell northern Borneo to the German Empire, Austria-Hungary and the Kingdom of Italy were unsuccessful, he went into business with Alfred Dent in 1877. In 1877 the Sultan of Brunei agreed to lease land to Overbeck, and in 1878 the Sultanate of Sulu similarly ceded their rights to land in north-eastern Borneo. Dent succeeded in obtaining British government backing for his North Borneo Company in 1881. Sandakan became the capital of North Borneo in 1884, replacing Kudat.

As the capital of North Borneo, Sandakan become an active commercial and trading centre. The main trading partners were Hong Kong and Singapore. Many Hong Kong traders eventually settled in Sandakan and in time the town was called the 'Little Hong Kong of North Borneo'. The Cowie settlement was accidentally burnt down on 15 June 1879 and was never thereafter rebuilt. The first British Resident, William B. Pryer then moved the administration to a new settlement on 21 June 1879 to a residence in what is today known as Buli Sim Sim near Sandakan Bay.

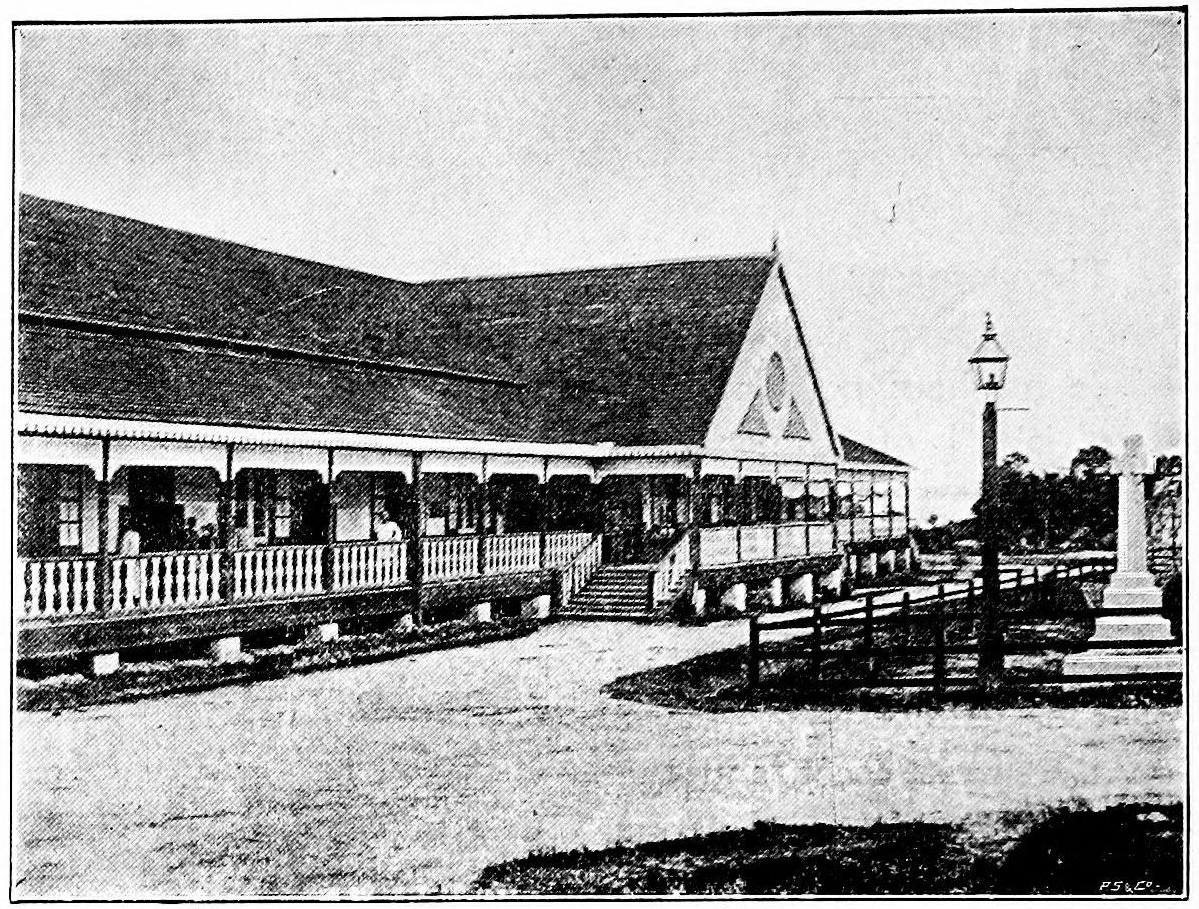
BNBC administration building in Sandakan in 1899.

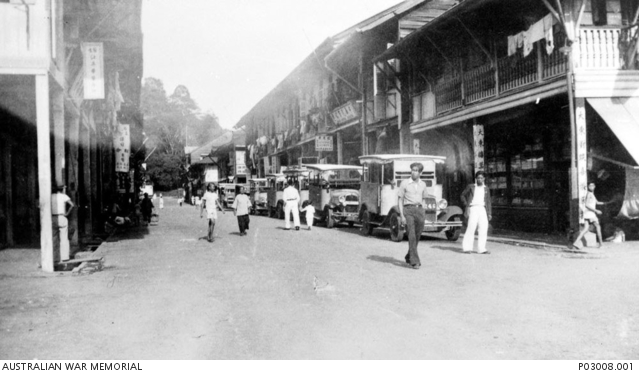
A street scene of the town in 1939 just before the beginning of the Second World War

During Pryer's tenure of being the first resident of Sandakan, one of his first tasks was to establish law and order. The situation in the nascent colony remained tense, with the Borneans being hostile towards the authority of the British North Borneo Company, and all-out warfare prevented only by the presence of Royal Navy ships offshore. To resolve the situation, Pryer imported policemen from British India and Singapore. His first contingent of police was made up of Indian Sikhs with a large body stature. The Indian police were probably from the Sepoy Company in India and were generally called 'Sipai' by the locals.

Meanwhile, the Spanish continued to strengthen their blockade of trade activities in the Sulu Archipelago, resulting in the blockade's opposition by Germans when many of their trading ships were seized by Spain. Both the German and British governments stated the archipelago should remain open to world trade route. Soon, the British began to co-operate with the Germans when rumours about the seizure of their trading ship by the Spanish began arriving to Great Britain which lead the British to oppose the Spanish action. British and Germans then refused to recognise the Spanish sovereignty over Sulu. But with strong opposition from Germans over the illegal seizures of their ships and the British fear of the German presence (which was stronger than the Spanish during the time), a protocol known as Madrid Protocol was then signed in Madrid to secure Spanish sovereignty over the archipelago, making the Spanish free to wage any war with the Sultanate of Sulu without the fear of other foreign western powers intervening and as a return the Spanish would not intervene in the affairs of British in northern Borneo.

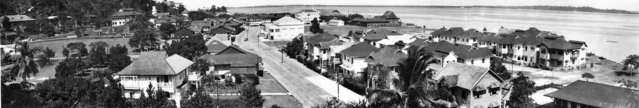
Town of Sandakan in 1941 before being destroyed during the Second World War.

The prosperity of Sandakan as the capital of North Borneo was however ended when the Japanese occupied the town on 19 January 1942. During their occupation, the Japanese restored the town's previous name, Elopura and established a prisoner of war camp to hold their captive enemies. Allied planes started to raid Sandakan in September 1944. As the Japanese feared further retaliation from the Allied forces, they began to move all prisoners and forced them to march to Ranau. Thousands of British and Australian soldiers lost their lives during this forced march in addition to Javanese labourers from the Dutch East Indies. Only six Australian soldiers survived from this camp, all after escaping. Sandakan was completely destroyed both by bombing from Allied forces and by the Japanese occupation.

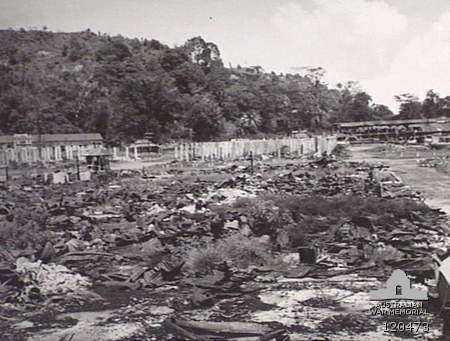
Sandakan was heavily damaged by bombing from Allied forces at the end of the war. The bombing was intended to flush out the Japanese who occupied the town during this period. The heavy damage to the town eventually led to the British moving the capital of British North Borneo to Jesselton.

At the end of the war, the British North Borneo Company returned to administer the town but were unable to finance the costs of reconstruction. They gave control of North Borneo to the British Crown on 15 July 1946. The new colonial government chose to move the capital of North Borneo to Jesselton instead of rebuilding it as the cost of reconstruction was higher due to the damage. Although Sandakan was no longer the administrative capital, it still remained as the "economic capital" with its port activities related to the export of timber and other agricultural products in the east coast. To improve the facilities, the Crown Colony administration designed a plan, later known as the "Colonial Office Reconstruction and Development Plan for North Borneo: 1948–1955". This plan established the Sandakan Fisheries Department in April 1948. As a first step towards the development of Sandakan's fishing industry, the Crown Colony devised the "Young Working Plan" through the "Colonial Development and Welfare Scheme". Through this plan, the British administration were given the responsibility to import basic materials from Hong Kong for fishermen and distribute the materials at a price lower than the one offered by the capitalists. As a result, Hong Kong towkays (bosses) were involved with the fishing industry in Sandakan.

== Government and international relations ==
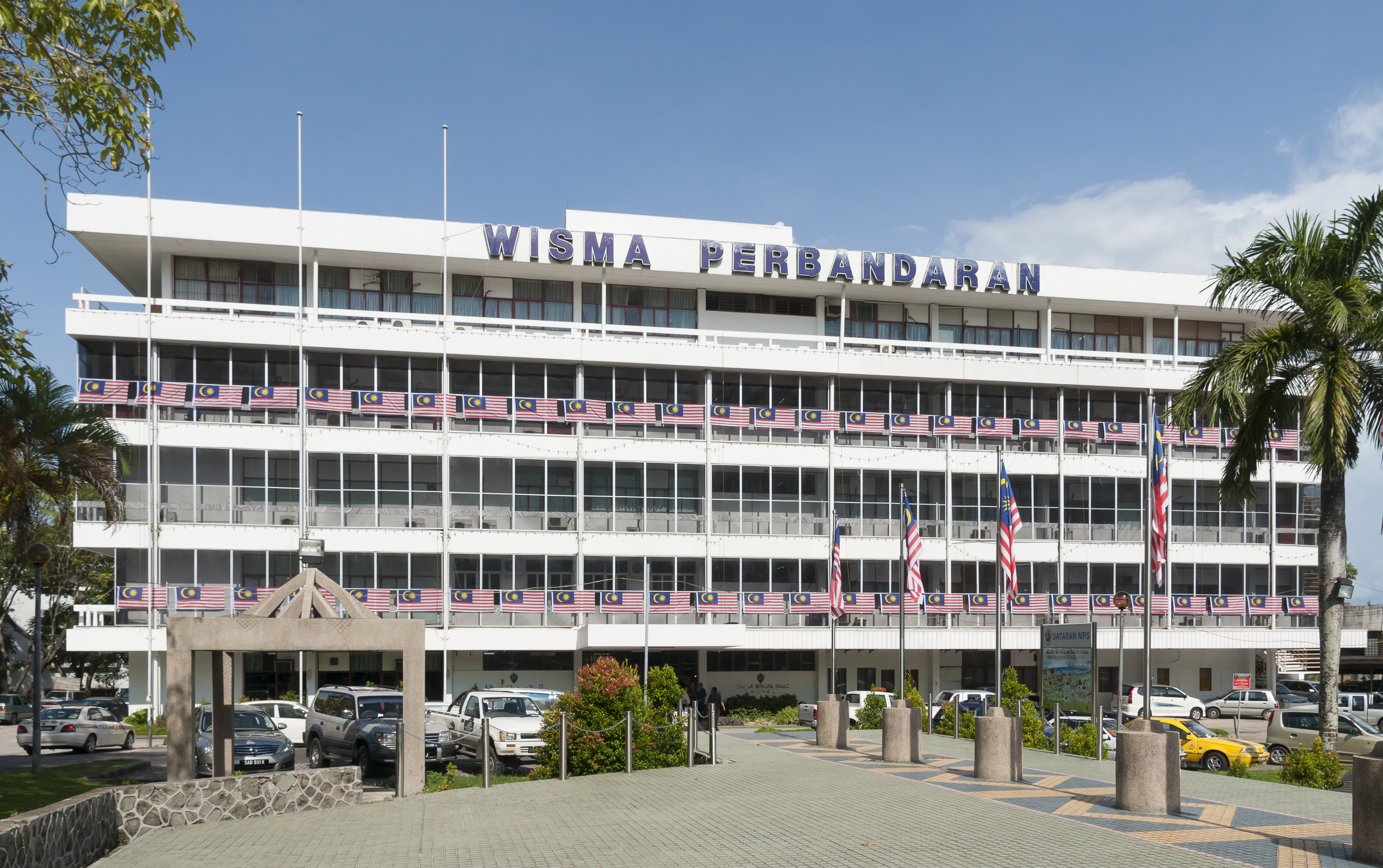
Sandakan Municipal Council building.

The town has twin town arrangements with Burwood, Australia and Zamboanga, Philippines.

The town is administered by the Sandakan Municipal Council (Majlis Perbandaran Sandakan). The current President of Sandakan Municipal Council is Walter Kenson, who took over from Henry Idol in February 2025. The area under the jurisdiction of the Sandakan District covers the town area (46 square miles), half-town area (56 square miles), rural areas and islands (773 square miles) with all the total area are 875 square miles.

=== Security ===
Sandakan is one of the six districts that is involved in the Eastern Sabah Security Command (ESSCOM), a dusk to dawn sea curfew which had been enforced since 19 July 2014 by the Malaysian government to repel attacks from militant groups in the Southern Philippines.

== Geography ==
Sandakan is located on the eastern coast of Sabah facing the Sulu Sea, with the town known as one of the port towns in Malaysia. The town is located approximately 1,900 kilometres east-northeast from Malaysia's capital Kuala Lumpur, 28 kilometres from the international border with the Philippines and 319 kilometres east of Kota Kinabalu, the capital of Sabah. The district itself is surrounded by Beluran (known as Labuk-Sugut District before) and Kinabatangan district. Not far from the town, there are the three Malaysian Turtle Islands, Selingaan, Gulisaan and Bakkungan Kechil. The nearest islands to the town are Berhala, Duyong, Nunuyan Darat, Nunuyan Laut, and Bai island.

=== Climate ===
Sandakan has a tropical rainforest climate under the Köppen climate classification. The climate is relatively hot and wet with average shade temperature about 32 °C, with around 32 °C at noon falling to around 27 °C at night. The town sees precipitation throughout the year, with a tendency for October to February to be the wettest months, while April is the driest month. Its mean rainfall varies from 2184 mm to 3988 mm.

Climate data for Sandakan (1991–2020 normals, extremes 1879–present)
| Month | Jan | Feb | Mar | Apr | May | Jun | Jul | Aug | Sep | Oct | Nov | Dec | Year |
|---|---|---|---|---|---|---|---|---|---|---|---|---|---|
| Record high °C (°F) | 34.8 (94.6) | 34.1 (93.4) | 33.6 (92.5) | 36.1 (97.0) | 36.5 (97.7) | 35.9 (96.6) | 36.0 (96.8) | 36.0 (96.8) | 35.6 (96.1) | 35.8 (96.4) | 34.6 (94.3) | 34.2 (93.6) | 36.5 (97.7) |
| Mean daily maximum °C (°F) | 29.6 (85.3) | 29.9 (85.8) | 30.8 (87.4) | 31.8 (89.2) | 32.7 (90.9) | 32.6 (90.7) | 32.5 (90.5) | 32.7 (90.9) | 32.5 (90.5) | 31.7 (89.1) | 30.9 (87.6) | 30.2 (86.4) | 31.5 (88.7) |
| Daily mean °C (°F) | 26.7 (80.1) | 27.0 (80.6) | 27.5 (81.5) | 28.1 (82.6) | 28.4 (83.1) | 28.0 (82.4) | 27.8 (82.0) | 27.9 (82.2) | 27.7 (81.9) | 27.5 (81.5) | 27.3 (81.1) | 27.0 (80.6) | 27.6 (81.7) |
| Mean daily minimum °C (°F) | 24.3 (75.7) | 24.3 (75.7) | 24.4 (75.9) | 24.7 (76.5) | 24.9 (76.8) | 24.5 (76.1) | 24.2 (75.6) | 24.2 (75.6) | 24.1 (75.4) | 24.2 (75.6) | 24.3 (75.7) | 24.4 (75.9) | 24.4 (75.9) |
| Record low °C (°F) | 18.3 (64.9) | 19.4 (66.9) | 20.0 (68.0) | 21.1 (70.0) | 21.1 (70.0) | 20.6 (69.1) | 20.2 (68.4) | 19.4 (66.9) | 20.6 (69.1) | 20.6 (69.1) | 20.0 (68.0) | 20.1 (68.2) | 18.3 (64.9) |
| Average precipitation mm (inches) | 444.0 (17.48) | 312.6 (12.31) | 229.4 (9.03) | 144.3 (5.68) | 138.4 (5.45) | 180.0 (7.09) | 209.3 (8.24) | 237.8 (9.36) | 246.5 (9.70) | 305.5 (12.03) | 323.6 (12.74) | 449.0 (17.68) | 3,220.3 (126.78) |
| Average precipitation days (≥ 1.0 mm) | 17.0 | 11.6 | 10.9 | 8.3 | 9.1 | 10.0 | 11.6 | 11.8 | 12.4 | 15.5 | 17.5 | 19.6 | 155.3 |
| Average relative humidity (%) | 84 | 83 | 82 | 81 | 82 | 82 | 83 | 83 | 84 | 85 | 86 | 86 | 84 |
| Mean monthly sunshine hours | 155.6 | 160.9 | 217.5 | 247.0 | 248.9 | 206.9 | 220.9 | 221.5 | 194.9 | 190.7 | 174.5 | 159.9 | 2,399.2 |
Source 1: World Meteorological Organization
Source 2: Meteo Climat (record highs and lows), Deutscher Wetterdienst (humidity, 1966–1990)

== Demography ==
=== Ethnicity and religion ===
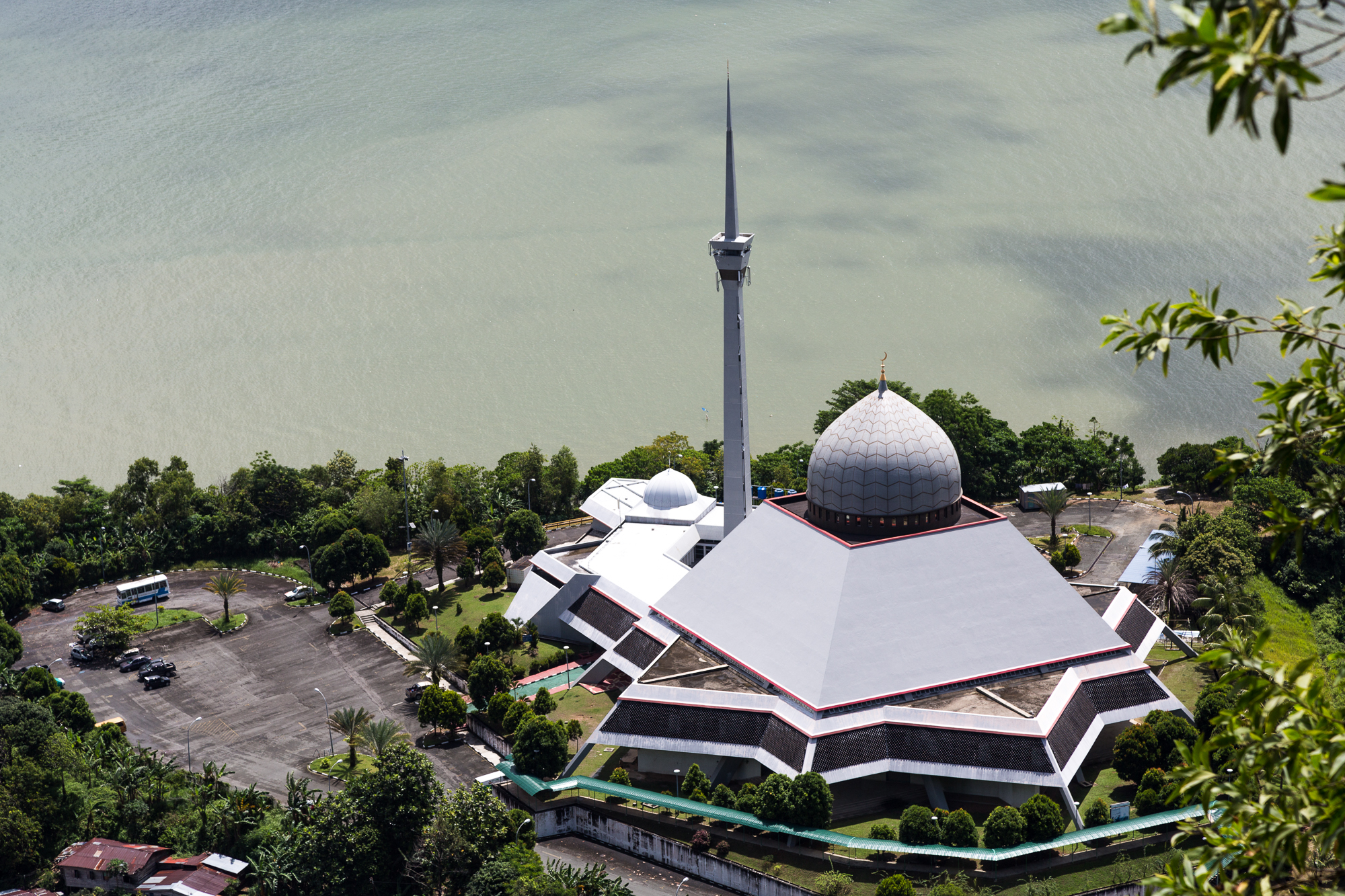
Sandakan District Mosque, the main mosque for the city and district.

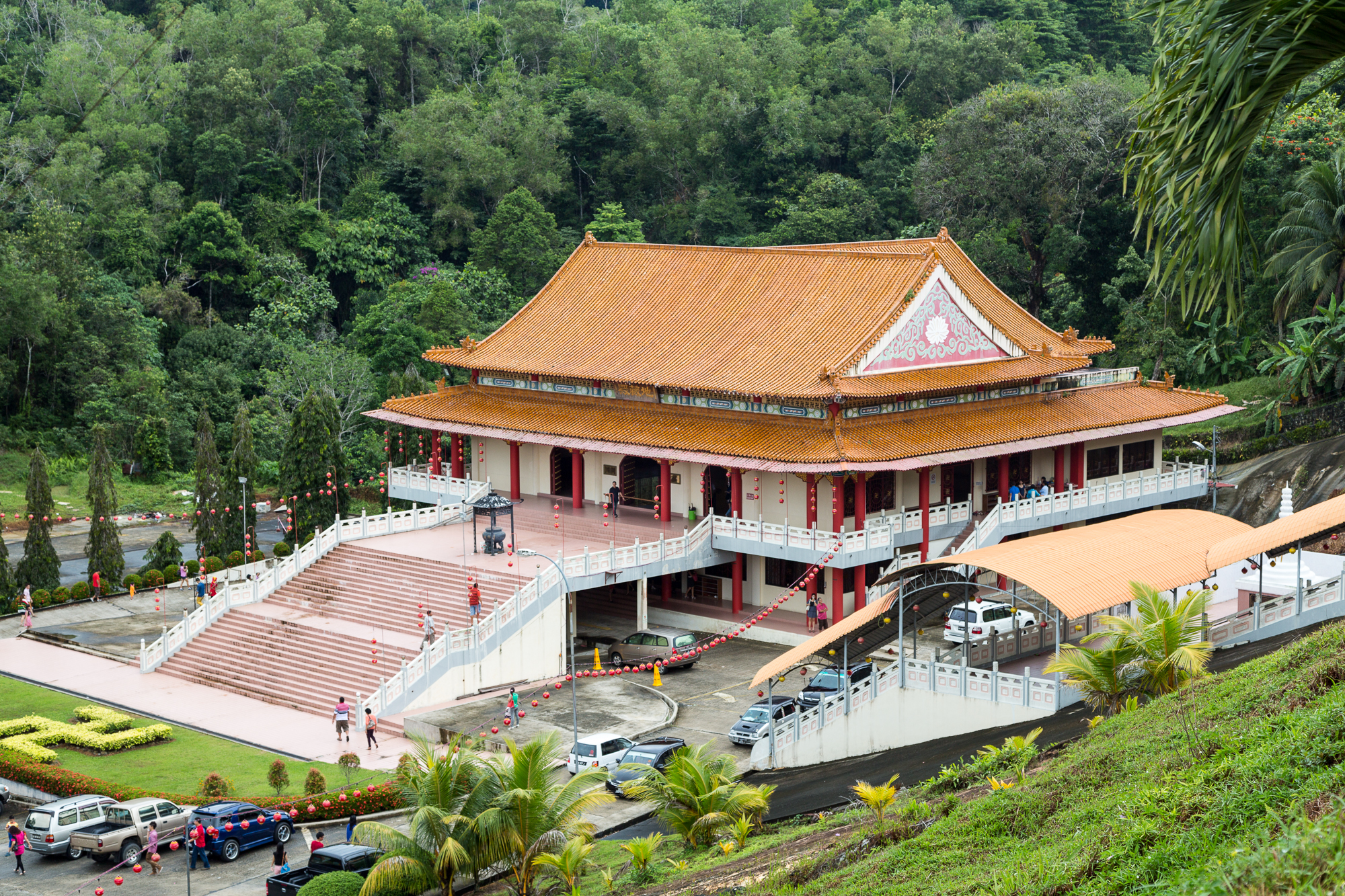
Puu Jih Shih Temple, built in 1987, the main Chinese temple in Sandakan.

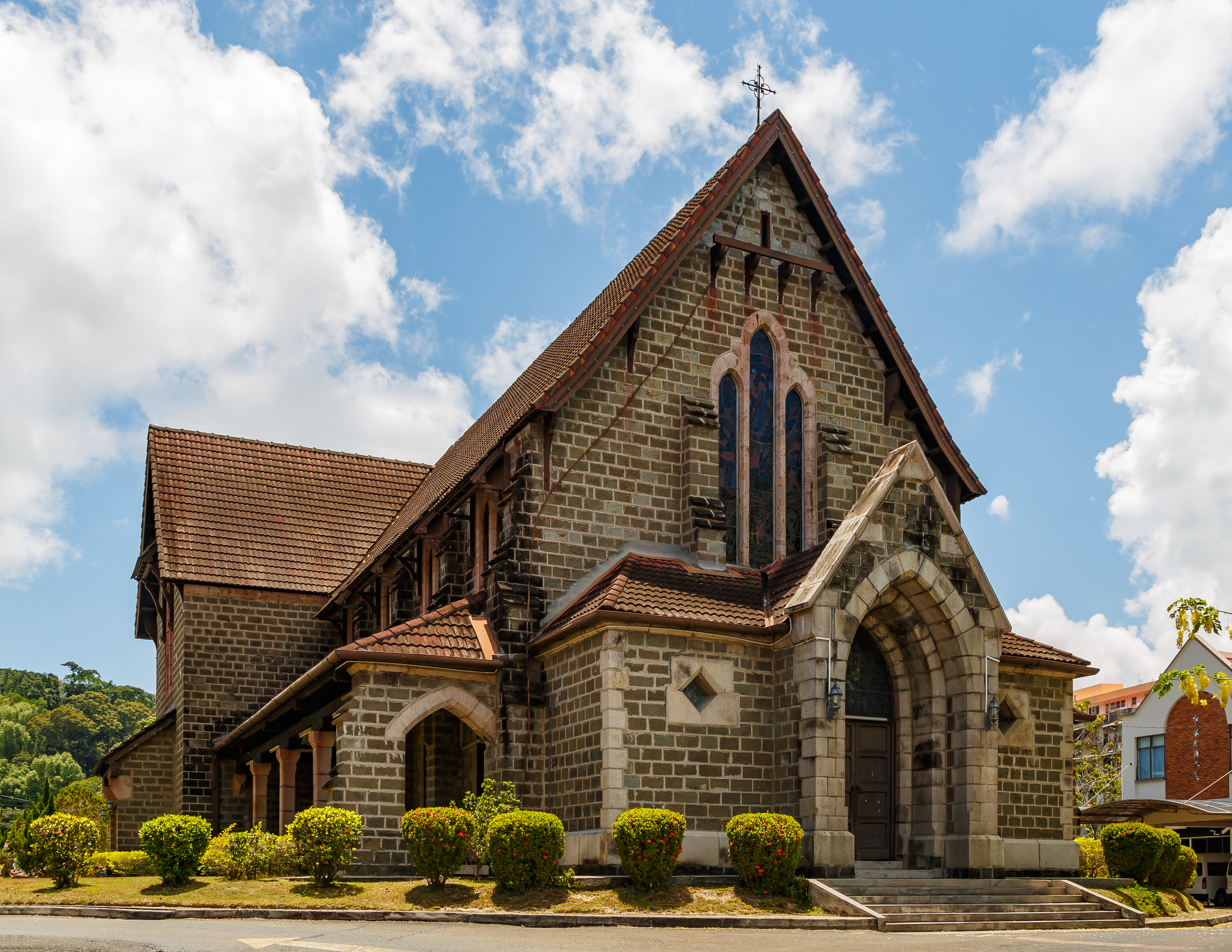
Parish of St. Michael's and All Angels, the oldest granite church in Sandakan.

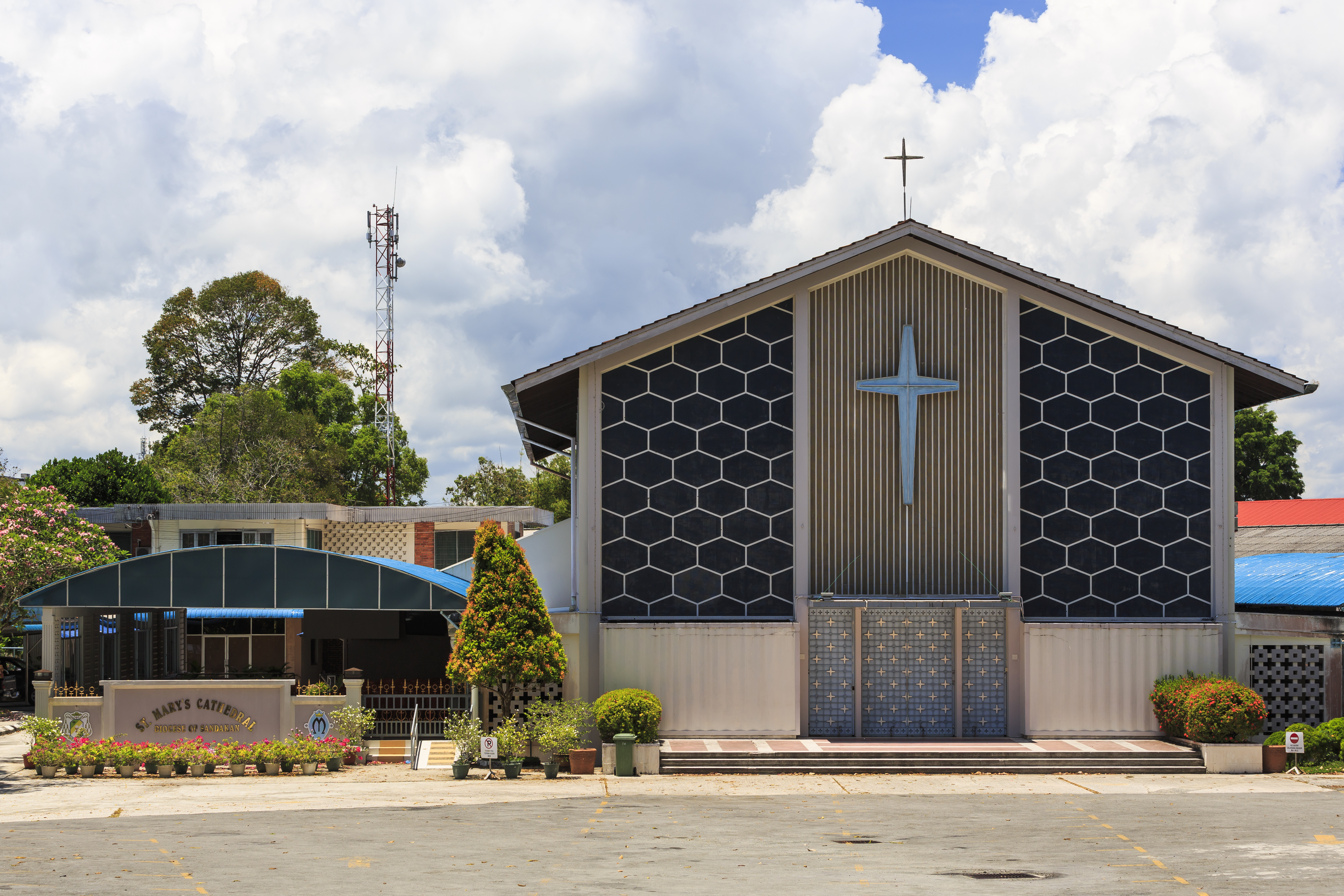
St. Mary's Cathedral

According to the Malaysian Census in 2010, the whole town municipality's area had a total population of 396,290. Non-Malaysian citizens form the majority of the town population with 144,840 people followed by other Bumiputras (100,245), Chinese (63,201), Bajau/Suluk (38,897), Malay (Bruneian Malays as well as Kedayans who are migrants from the West Coast and their descendants together with ethnic Cocos Malay internal migrants from the Tawau division, as well as ethnic groups such as the Bugis, Javanese and Banjarese peoples) (22,244), Kadazan-Dusun (16,616), Indian (974), Murut and Lundayeh (519) and others (8,754). The 2020 Census showed a growth in the municipal population to 439,050.

Most of the non-Malaysian citizens are from the southern Philippines. The Chinese population here are equal proportions of mostly Cantonese (descendants of seafaring traders who settled in the East Coast of North Borneo then) and also Hakka (mostly descended from voluntary migrants and Taiping Rebellion refugees), who arrived during the British period and had their original settlements before in the town which is now known as the Chinese Farm River Village. The Bajau, Suluk and Malays are majority Muslims, Kadazan-Dusuns and Muruts mainly practice Christianity with some of them having become Muslims while the Chinese are mainly Buddhists, Taoist and some Christians. There is also a small number of Hindus, Sikhs, Animists, and secularists.

The large group of non-citizens have been identified as a majority Muslim, and there are some Christian Filipino women who converted to Islam to marry Muslim Filipinos here. Like in Kota Kinabalu, the first wave of these immigrants arrived in the late 15th century during the Spanish colonisation, while the others arrived in the early 1970s because of the troubles in southern Philippines. They consist of migrant workers, with many of them being naturalised as Malaysian citizens. However, there are still many who live without proper documentation as illegal immigrants in the town with their own illegal settlement.

=== Languages ===
Like the national language, the people of Sandakan mainly speak Malay, with a distinct Sabahan creole. The Malay language in Sandakan are different from the Malay language in the west coast which resembles Brunei Malay. In Sandakan, this language has been influenced by many words from the Suluk language. As Sandakan had also been dominated by the Hakka and Cantonese Chinese, Hakka and Cantonese widely spoken, while today Mandarin, as well as a lesser extent Cantonese dominates as the lingua franca among both dialect subgroups (since both the local ethnic Chinese populations native to this town share the same ancestral province in China, Guangdong, in the case of the usage of the Cantonese dialect as a lingua franca among both the local Cantonese and Hakka populations, while Mandarin is the standardised spoken form of the Chinese language used in the business and education sectors). While for the east coast Bajau, their language has similarities with the Sama language in the Philippines and also borrowed many words from the Suluk language which is different from the west coast Bajau who had been influenced by the Malayic languages of Brunei Malay.

== Economy ==
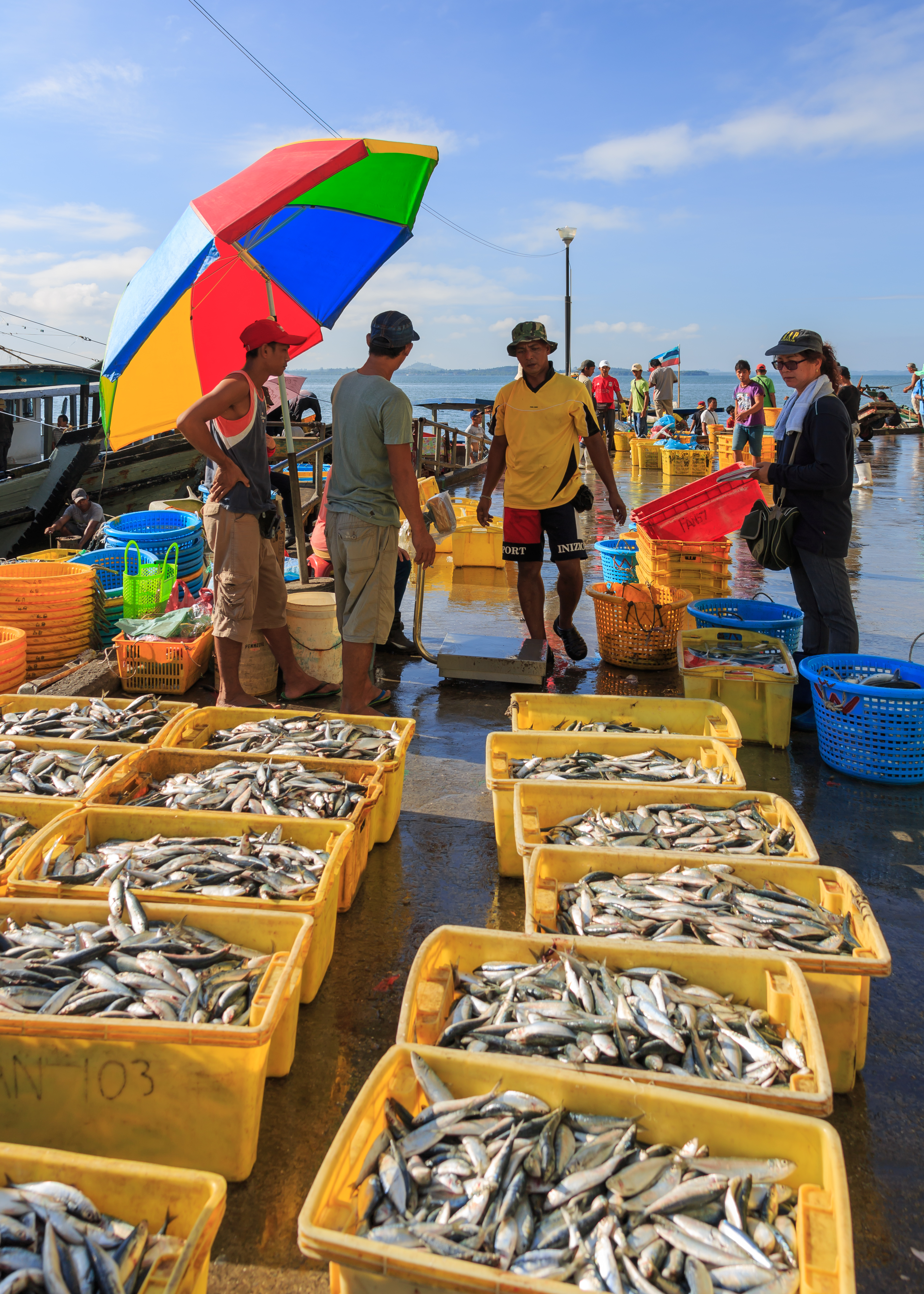
Fish market in Sandakan, part of the fishery activities in the town.

During the British period, Sandakan grew quickly as one of the largest British settlements on the east coast of North Borneo including having been the former capital of the territory. It grew rapidly due to the export activities as a port town. The port is important for palm oil, tobacco, cocoa, coffee, manila hemp and sago exports. In the mid-1930s, the export of tropical timber from Sandakan recorded a level of 180,000 cubic metres which made the town as the world's largest exporter of hardwood. Many Sandakan wood logs are now found in Beijing's Temple of Heaven. Sandakan also enjoyed modern developments such as telegraph service to London and paved streets before Hong Kong and Singapore.

The overseas Chinese have contributed to the development of the town since their immigration in the late 19th century. The immigrants to Sandakan were farmers and labourers while some of them worked as businessmen and entrepreneurs. In the modern days, Sandakan have been poised to become one of Sabah business hubs. The town itself is one of Sabah's major port, other than in Kota Kinabalu, Sepanggar Bay, Tawau, Lahad Datu, Kudat, Semporna and Kunak. Sandakan district is known for its eco-tourism centres, such as the orangutan rehabilitation station in Sepilok Rehabilitation Centre, the Turtle Islands Park, the Kinabatangan River and the Gomantong Caves which are famous for their edible bird's nest. Due to Sandakan geographical proximity to Southern Philippines, there is also a barter trade connection and Sandakan is considered as a transit point for food entering the Southern Philippines. The state government has been assisting traders to improve their trading system and providing infrastructure facilities.

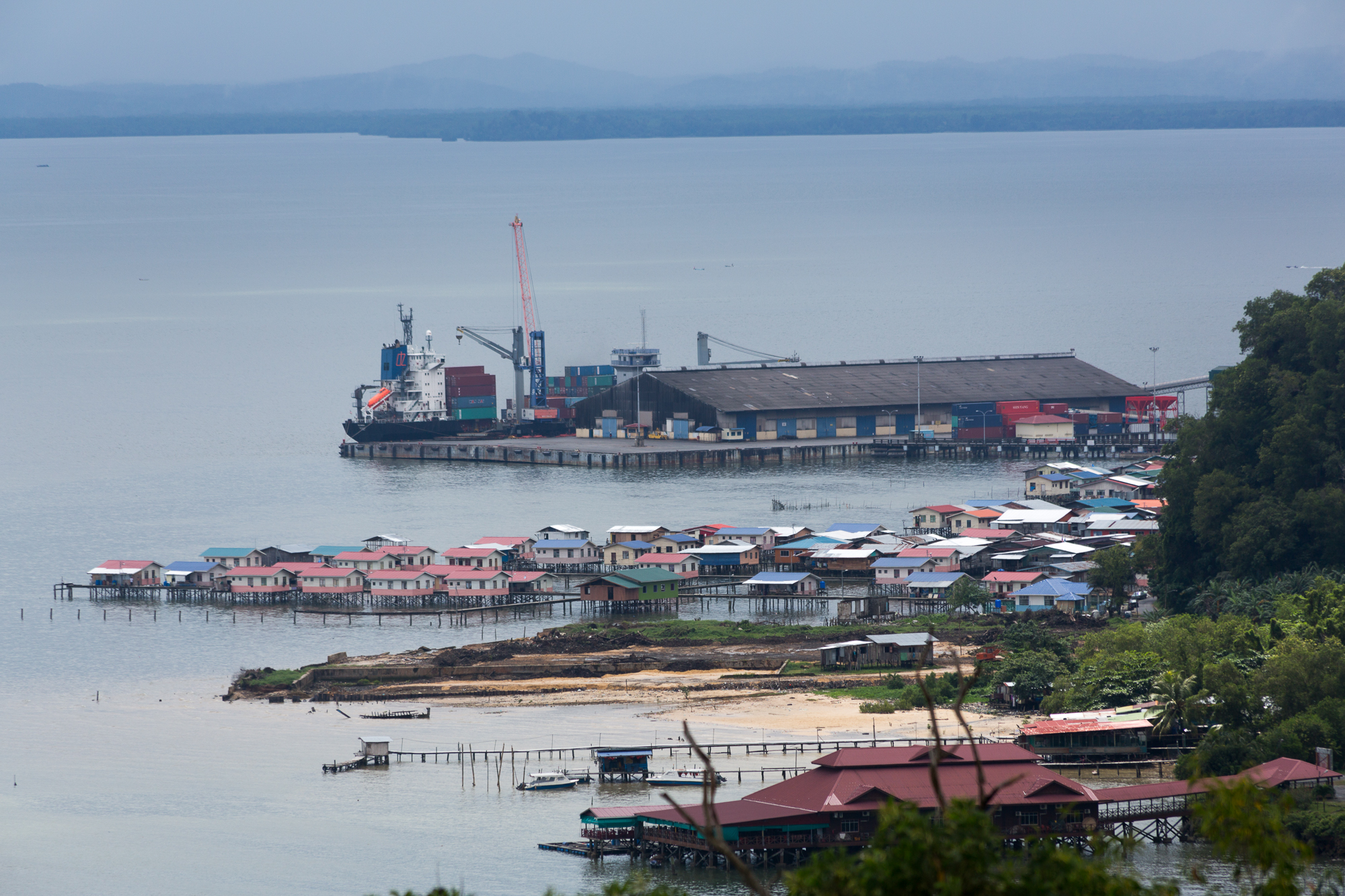
Part of Sandakan port, port industry is one of the economic activities for the town since the British period.

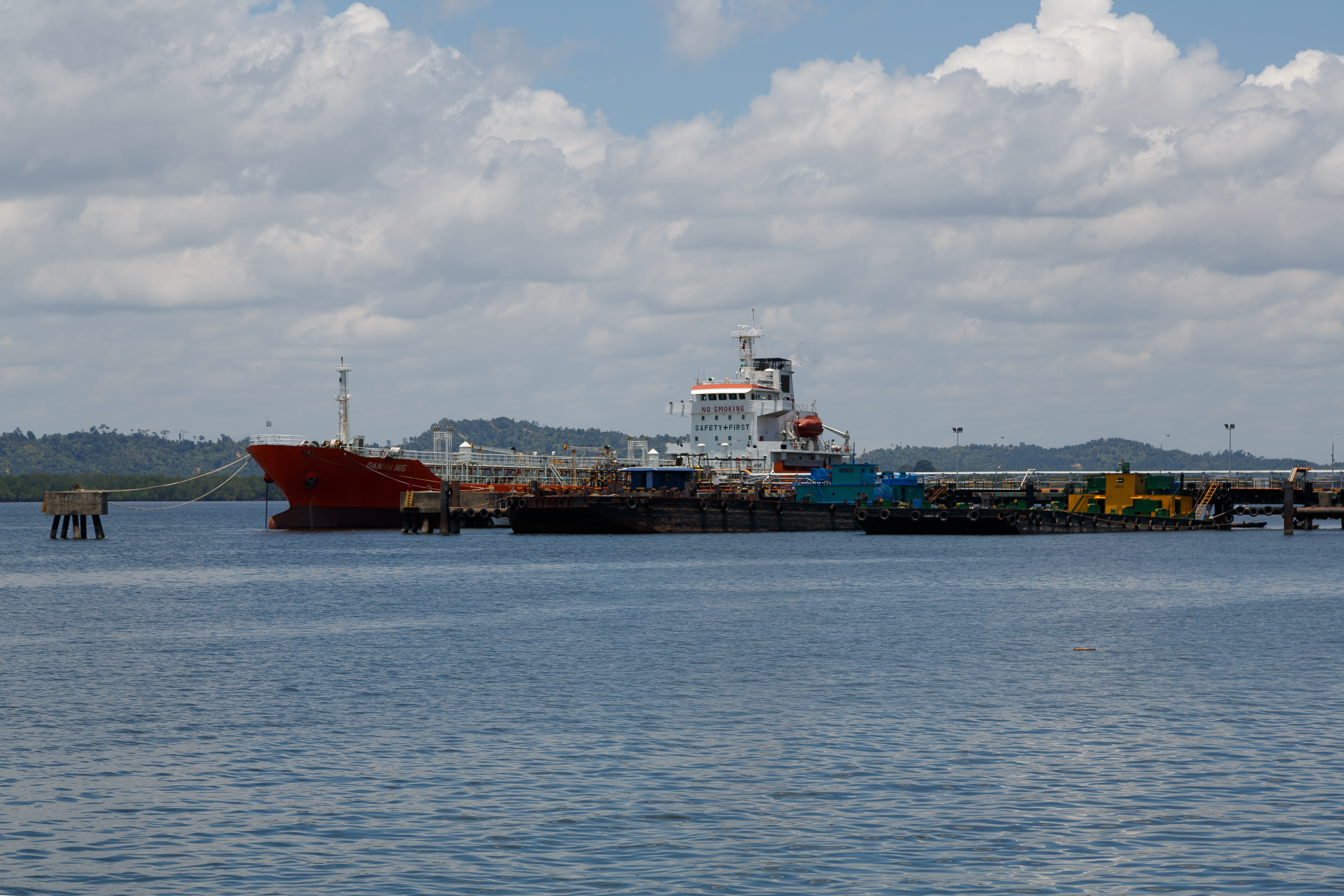
A tank ship for the transportation of edible oil.

Sandakan main industrial zones are basically based on three areas such as the Kamunting area known for its oil depots, edible oil refinery and glue factories. In Batu Sapi, a shipyard, fertiliser oxygen gas and wood-based factories are situated. Since 2012, the State Public Works Department (PWD) has undertaking three projects to upgrade roads in Sandakan. A grand specialised industrial park, Majulah Industrial Centre have also started operating in 2015. The proposed Seguntor industrial area consists of 1,950 hectares (4,833 acres) is originally an agricultural area and the area is now in the process to be re-zoning into an industrial area. 2,531 acres will be for wood-based industries while another 2,302 will be used for general industries. At present, 55 wood-based factories have been approved, of which 35 has been into operation. While another total of 340 hectares area for general industries and 30 hectares for service industries are located in various parts of Sandakan.

But in recent years, many businessmen have shifted their operations away from the town centre to other suburbs due to a large presence of illegal immigrants from Mindanao islands in the Philippines which has caused trouble, mostly crime such as theft and vandalism on public facility and also solid waste pollution in marine and coastal areas. But later in January 2003, an urban renewal project, was launched to revive the town centre as a commercial hub in Sandakan and since 2013, the Government of Malaysia has launched a major crackdown on illegal immigrants.

== Transportation ==
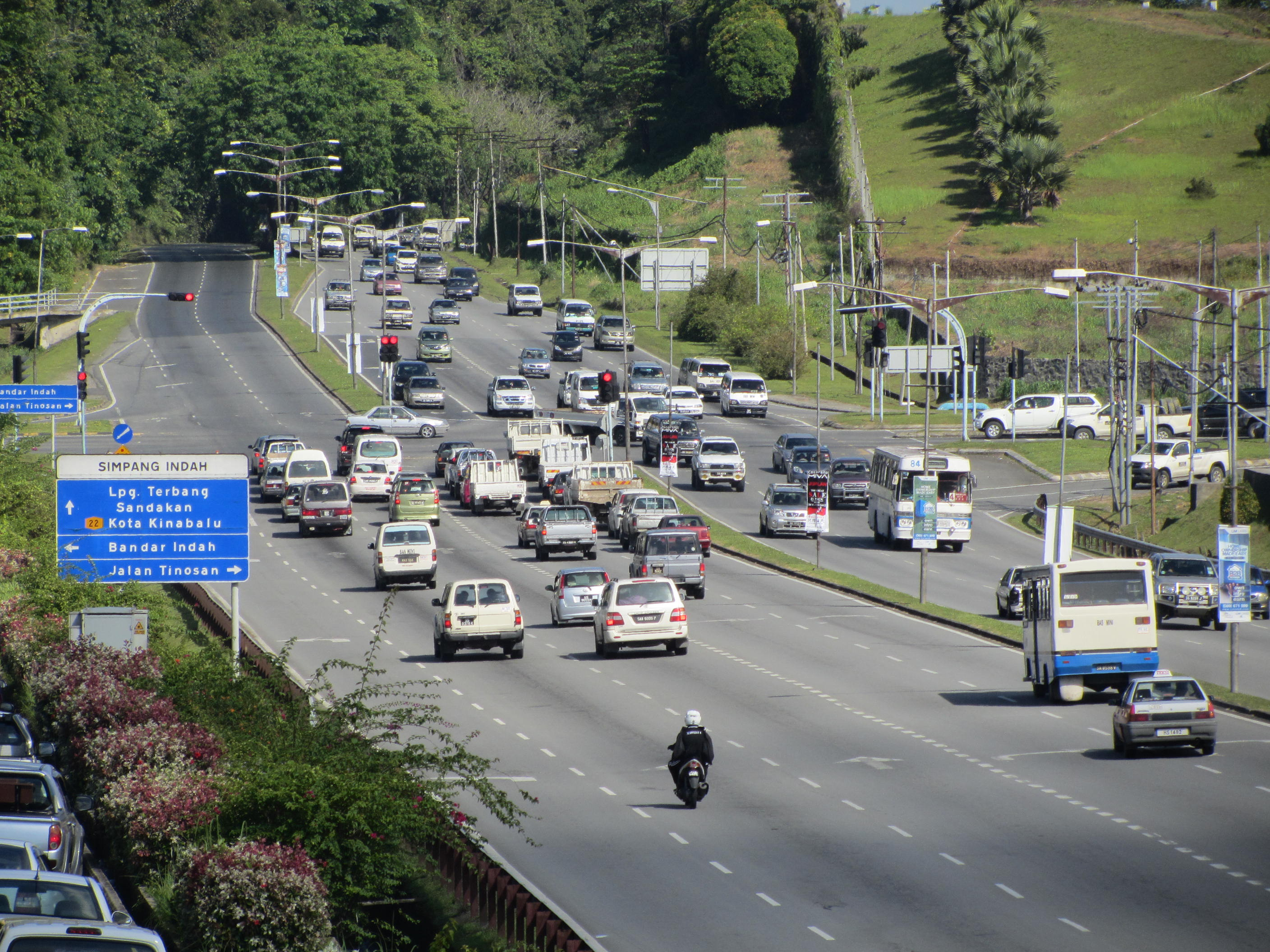
Indah Intersection in Indah Jaya Town, the main intersection in Sandakan.

All the internal roads linking different parts of the town are generally state roads constructed and maintained by the state's Public Works Department, while the local council (Sandakan Municipal Council) oversees the housing estates roads. Currently, most roads in Sandakan are undergoing major upgrades due to issues like the lack of road networks and overloading. There is only one federal arterial road which links Sandakan to the west coast of Sabah, the Federal Route 22, while other roads including the internal roads are called state roads. Most major internal roads are dual-carriageways. The only highway route from Tawau connects: Sandakan – Telupid – Ranau – Kundasang – Tamparuli – Tuaran – Kota Kinabalu, as well Lahad Datu – Kunak – Semporna – Tawau (part of the Pan Borneo Highway)

Regular bus services with minivans and taxis also can be found. There are three bus terminals operating in the town such as the Buses to Sepilok, Local Bus Terminal and the Long Distance Bus Terminal. The long-distance bus terminal is located about 4 km north of the town while the local bus connects with the centre of the town.

Sandakan Airport (SA) (ICAO Code: WBKS) provides flights linking the town to other domestic destinations. To boost the twin town relationship with Zamboanga City and for the ASEAN spirit in the BIMP-EAGA region, there is an international route from Sandakan to Zamboanga International Airport. Local destinations for the airport including Kota Kinabalu, Kuching, Kuala Lumpur and many others. It is also one of the destinations for MASWings, which serves flights to other smaller towns or rural areas in East Malaysia. As of 2014, the airport is being upgraded and expanded to accommodate additional travellers.

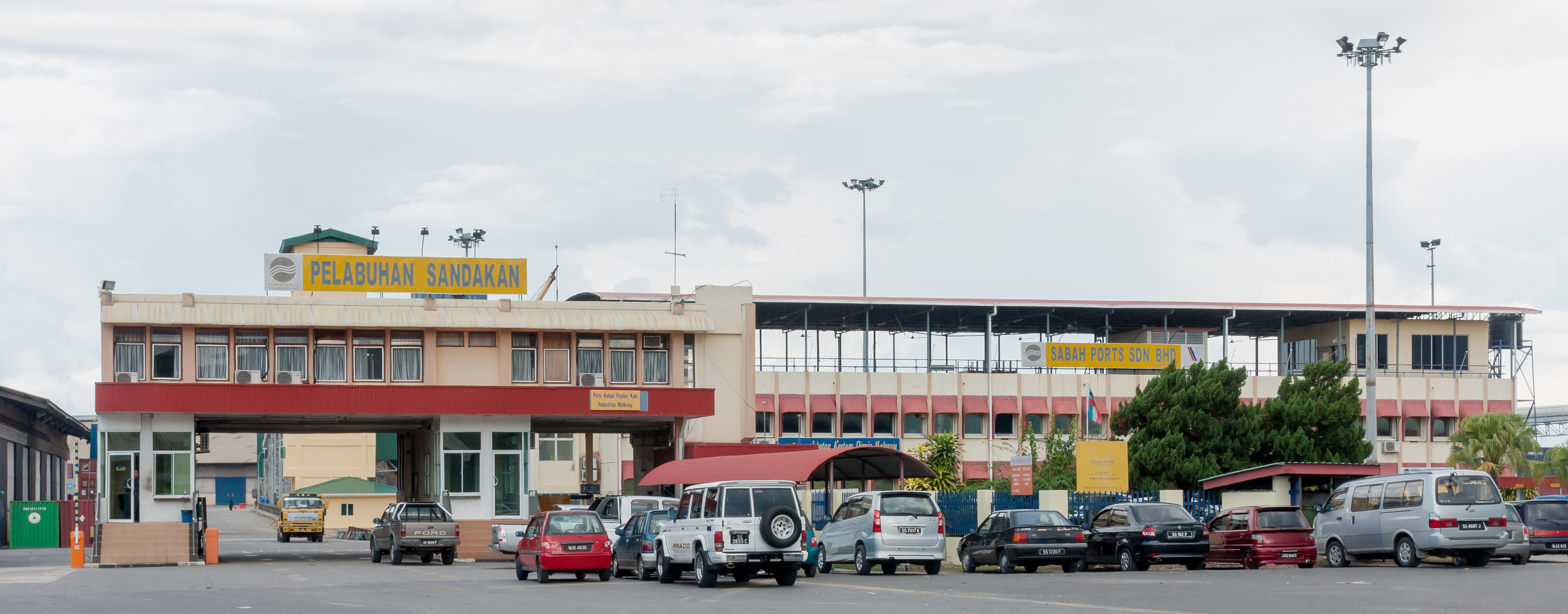
The Sandakan Port.

There is a ferry terminal which connects the town with some parts in the Southern Philippines such as Zamboanga City, the Sulu Archipelago and Tawi-Tawi. The state government have tried to proposed a new ferry terminal in the town to attract more tourist particularly from the Philippines and also from Indonesia. But the proposal was turned down due to the trouble in the southern Philippines which could spread to the state and there is a call from the former Chief Minister of Sabah and the Current President of Sabah Progressive Party Yong Teck Lee to suspend the ferry service to counter the high level of people migration from the Philippines which now has become the major problem to Sabah as they are overstaying in the state and becoming illegal immigrants.

== Public services ==
The first court in the city was built in 1957. Due to increasing demand following an expanding population, the Sessions' court and Magistrates' court were shifted to the Sandakan Municipal Council building (Wisma Warisan) opposite in 1990, while the High Court remained in the old building. The Sandakan War Monument is located near these buildings.

In 2001, a new court complex was built in mile 7. The new court complex was completed and started operating in 2003. It was then being launch in 2005. After the new court complex started operating, the old court was then being left completely abandoned. Another court for the Sharia law was also located in the town.

The district police headquarters is located at Lebuh Empat, along with the town police station located not far from the court beside the Wisma Sandakan. Other police station can be found throughout the district such as in KM52, Ulu Dusun and in Seguntor. Police substations (Pondok Polis) are found in Sg. Manila, Suan Lamba, Sibuga and Kim Fong BT4 areas, and the Sandakan Prison is located in the town centre.

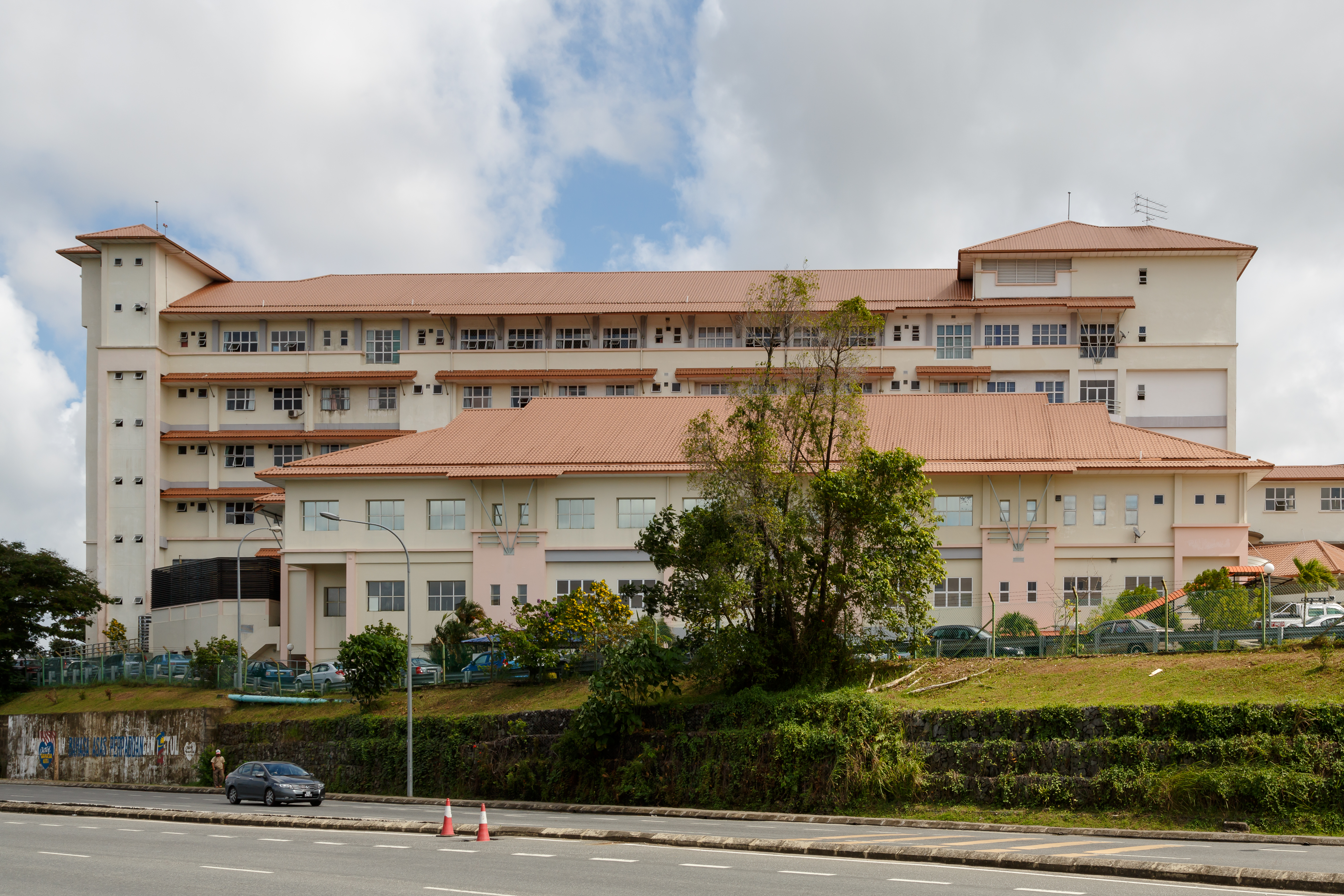
The Duchess of Kent Hospital.

There are one public hospital, eight public health clinics, one child and mother health clinic, eight village clinics, three mobile clinics, and two community clinics in Sandakan. The Duchess of Kent Hospital, which is located along North Street (Jalan Utara), is the main and second largest public hospital in Sabah after the Queen Elizabeth Hospital with 400 beds. Built in 1951, it is also become the first modern and one of the important hospital in Sabah.

In 2008, a private hospital was proposed to be built at the North Street. The Fook Kuin Medical Centre would be the largest private hospital in Sabah with 276 beds surpassing the Sabah Medical Centre with 134 beds in Kota Kinabalu once it finished in 2011. The Sandakan Regional Library is located in the town and is one of three regional libraries in Sabah, the other in Keningau and Tawau. All these libraries are operated by the Sabah State Library department.

== Education ==
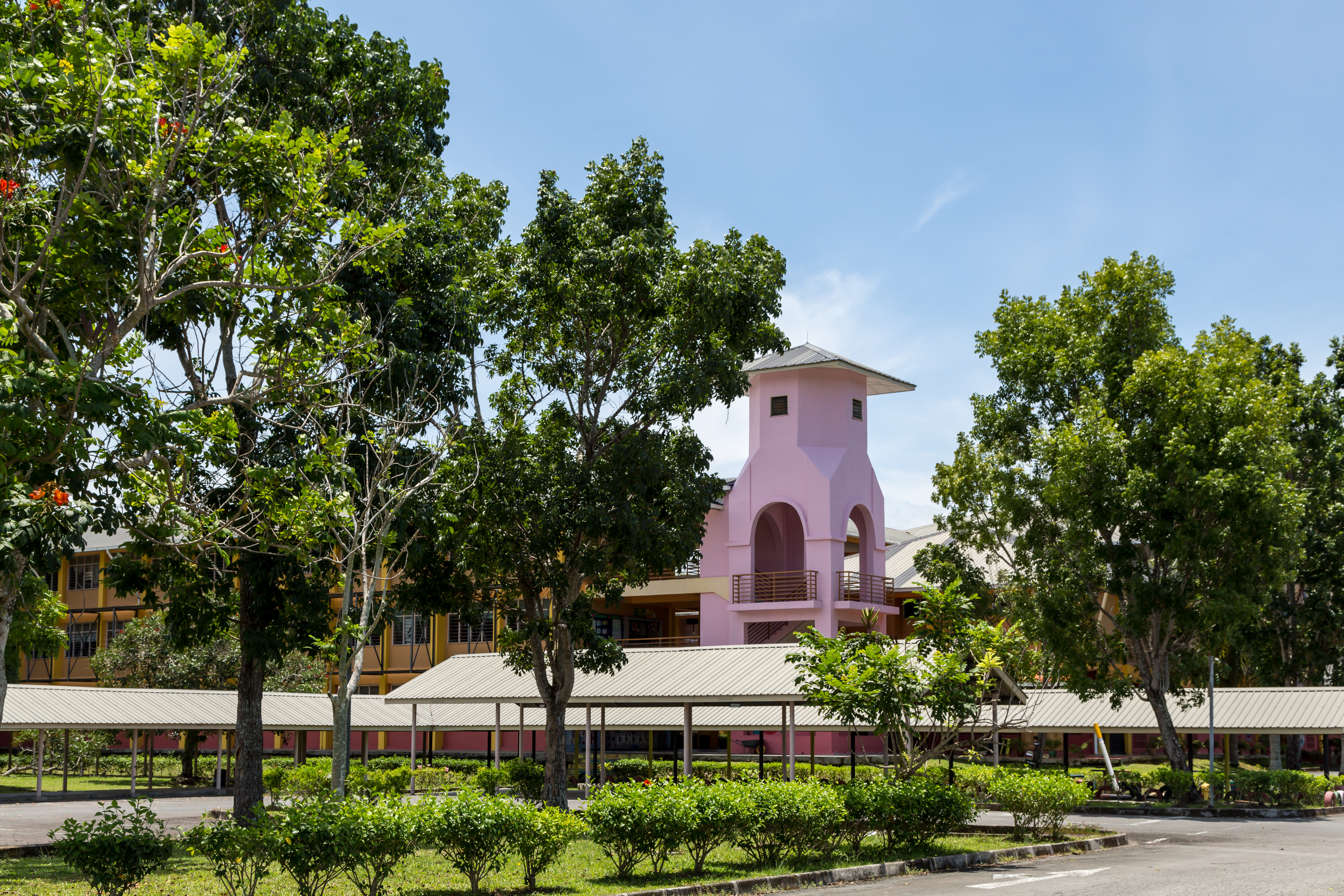
One of the secondary school in Sandakan, the SMK Sandakan II.

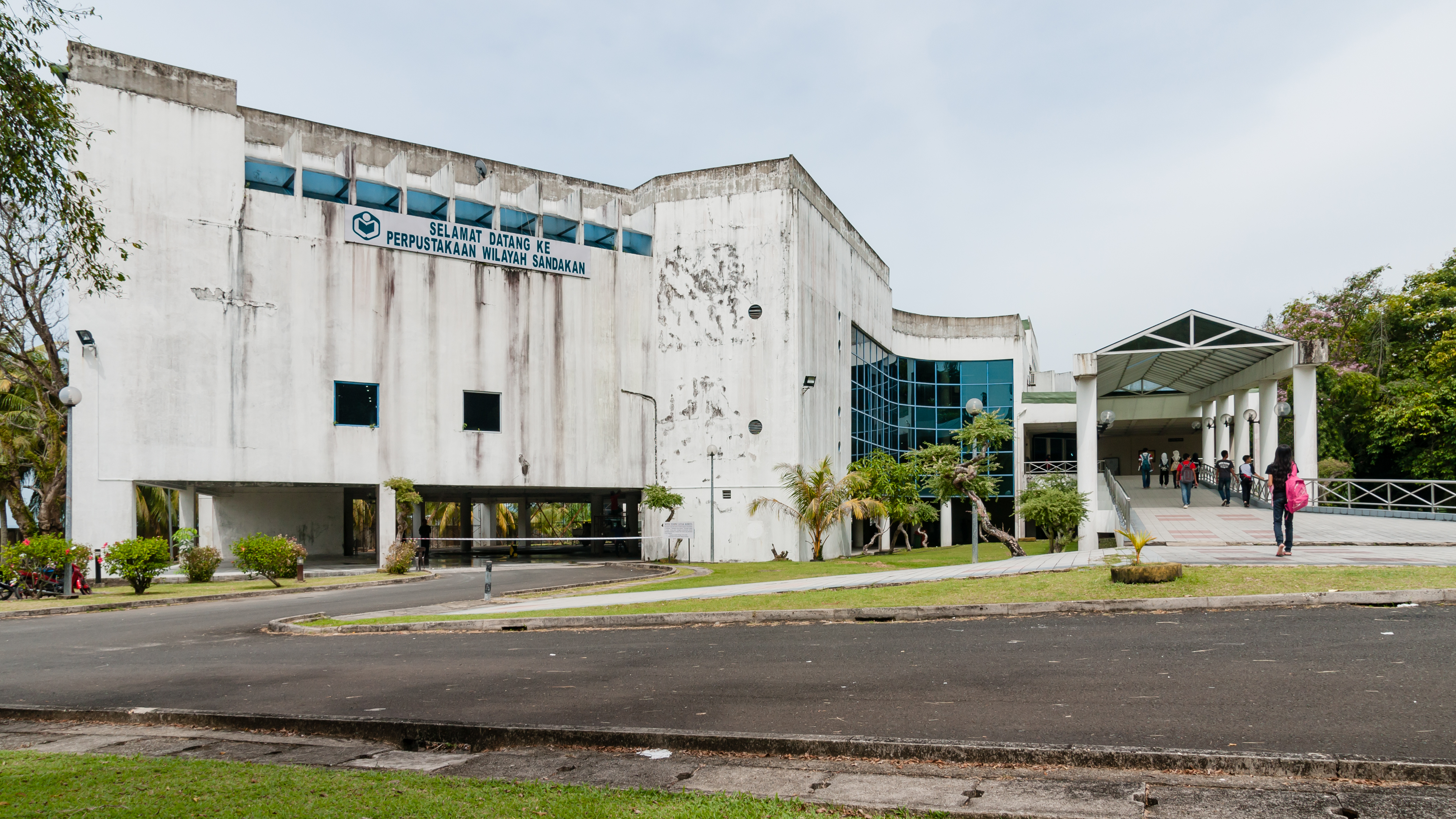
The Sandakan Regional Library.

There are many government or state schools in and around the town. The first primary school in the town was St. Mary Town Primary School which was opened by Rev. Fr. A. Prenger who became the first headmaster along with Rev. Fr. Pundleider, who is a Mill Hill's priests. It is an all boys Catholic Mission School and have been opened since 24 July 1883, making it as the oldest school in Borneo. Notable secondary schools include Sekolah Menengah Kebangsaan Elopura II St Cecilia's Convent Secondary School, St. Michael's Secondary School, and Sung Siew Secondary School. One independent private school is also present in the town called the Yu Yuan Secondary School.

== Culture and leisure ==
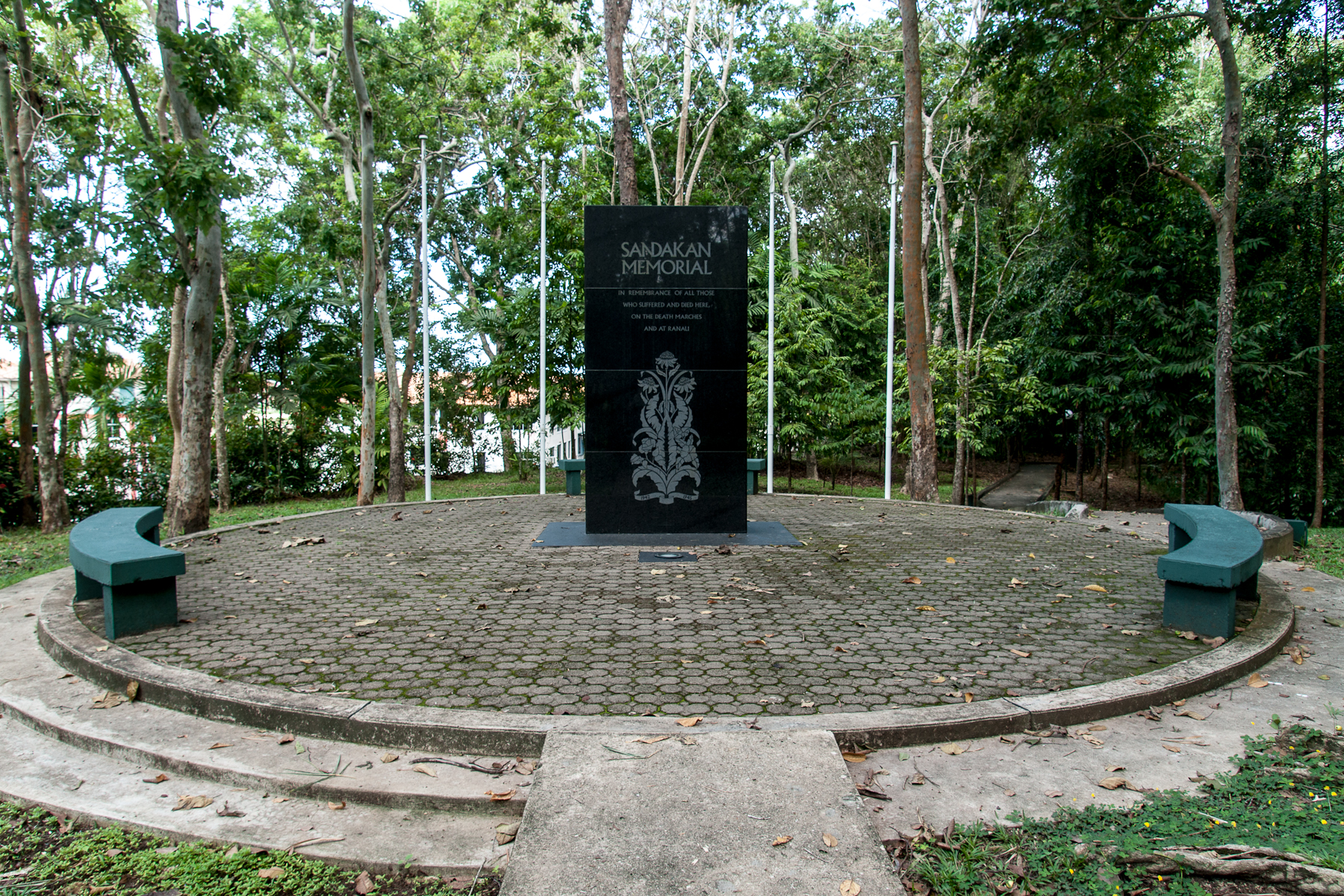
Sandakan Memorial Park, the site where the Sandakan prisoner of war camp is located.

Several cultural venues are located in Sandakan. The Sandakan Heritage Museum, situated at the Lebuh Empat Road, is the main museum of Sandakan. The museum is located on the right-hand side of the ground and on the first floor of the Wisma Warisan Building which is next to the municipal building. Besides that, a cultural festival known as Sandakan Festival is celebrated once a year in the town, after having been introduced in 2000 by the Sandakan Municipal Council.

Another museum in Sandakan is the Agnes Keith House which is located on top of the hill along Istana Street. The house is known as the former home to Harry Keith and his wife Agnes Newton Keith. Other historical attractions include the Chartered Company Memorial, Chong Tain Vun Memorial, Japanese Bunker, Malaysia Fountain, Marian Hill, Mill Hill Dam, North Borneo Scout Movement Memorial, Sandakan Japanese Cemetery, Sandakan Liberation Monument, Sandakan Massacre Memorial, Sandakan Memorial Park, Sandakan War Memorial and the William Pryer Memorial. The oldest religious buildings are the St. Mary's Cathedral, Parish of St. Michael's and All Angels, the Sam Sing Kung Temple and the Jamek Mosque, which was opened by a Muslim cloth merchant from India, known as Damsah, in 1890.

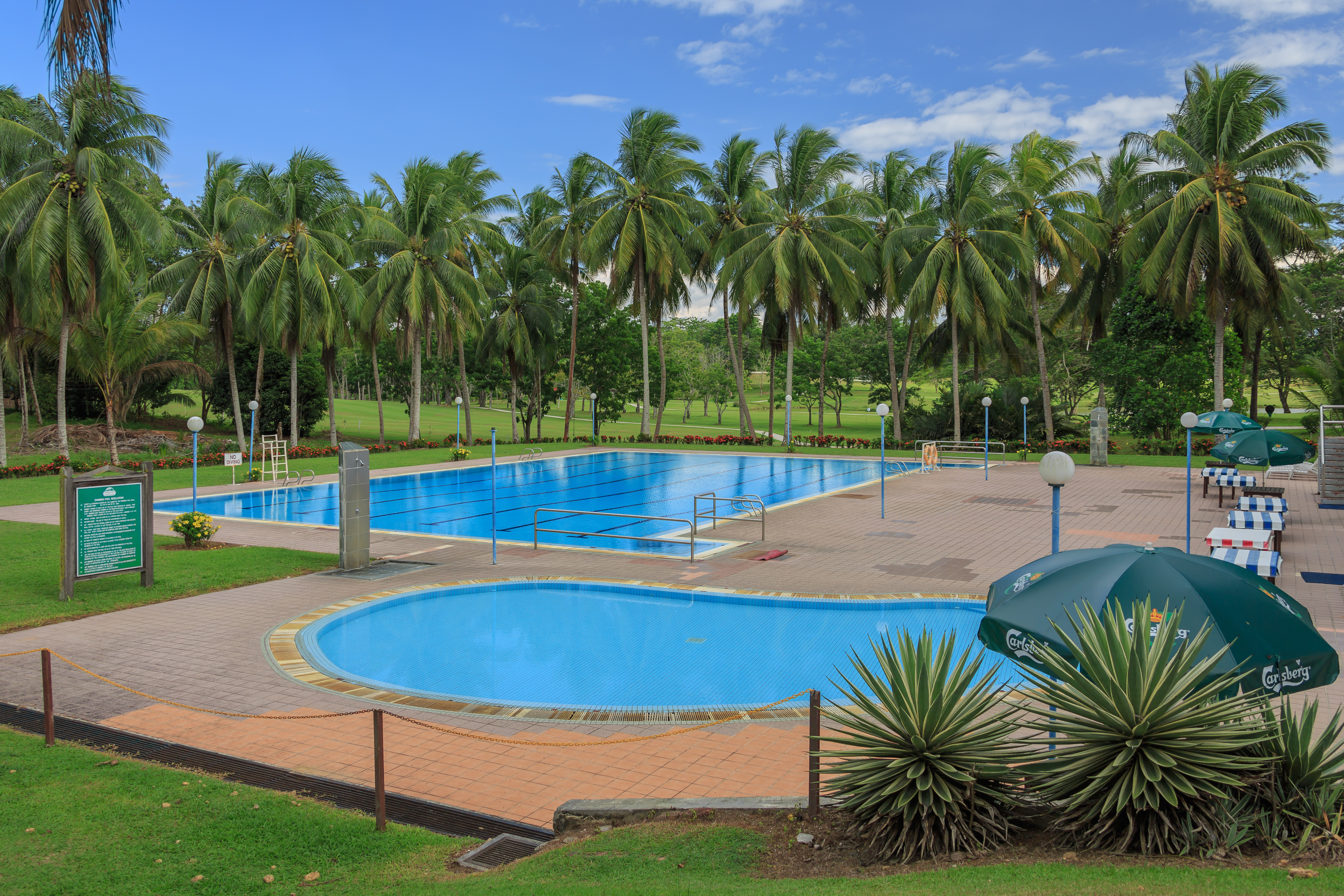
Sandakan Golf and Country Club.

A number of leisure spots and conservation areas are available around Sandakan. The Sepilok Orang Utan Sanctuary is a place where orphaned or injured orangutans are brought to be rehabilitated to return to forest life. Established in 1964, it is one of only four orangutan sanctuaries in the world. Other conservation areas are the Malaysian Turtle Islands where many turtles lay their eggs on the islands. They cover an area of 1,740 hectares which includes the surrounding reefs and seas. The islands are also ideal for swimming, snorkelling and scuba diving. Bornean Sun Bear Conservation Centre is also another wildlife conservation and research centre here and it aims to improve the animal welfare and rehabilitation of the Malayan sun bear.

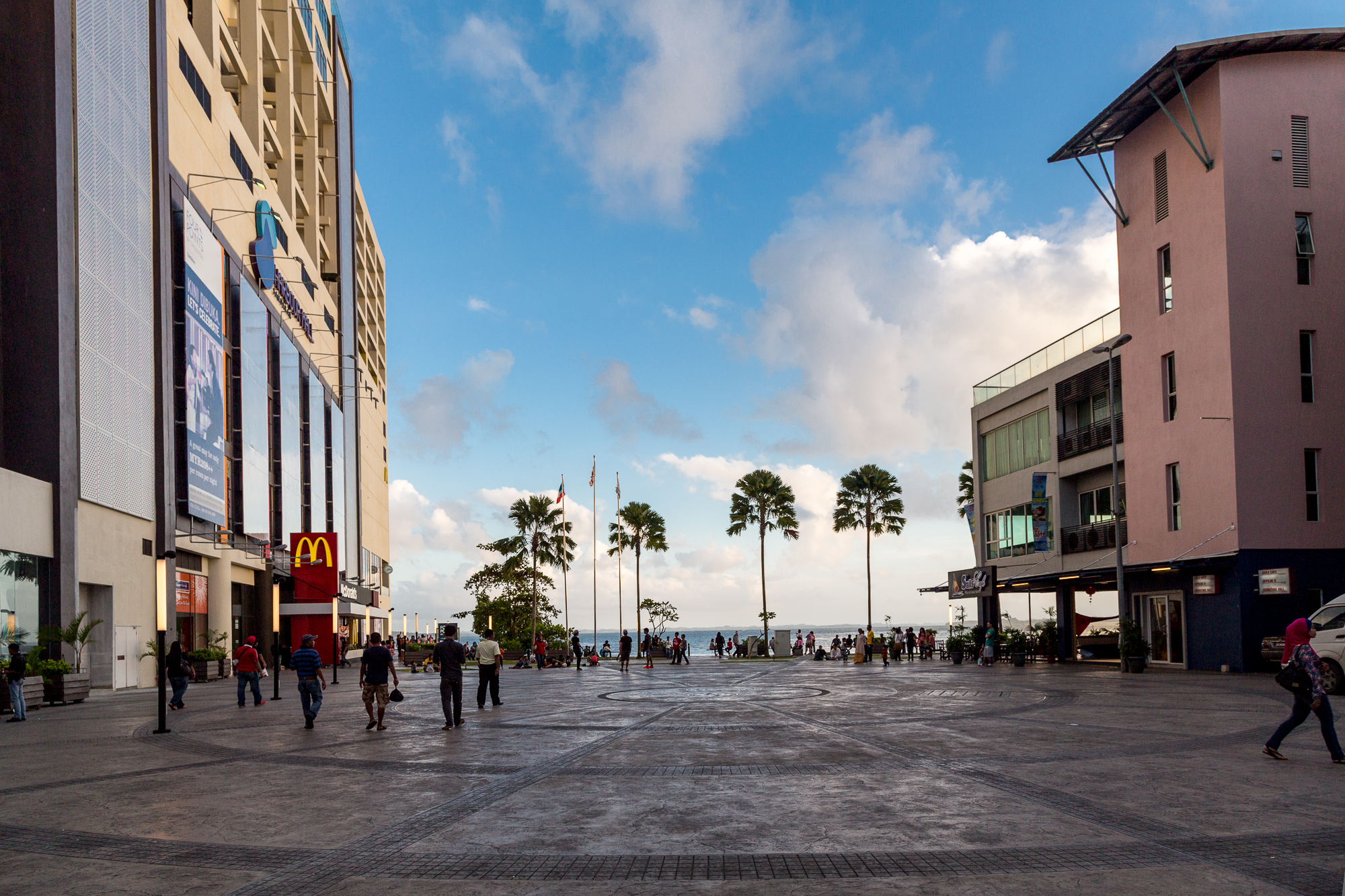
Sandakan Harbour Square, the main shopping destination for the citizens of Sandakan.

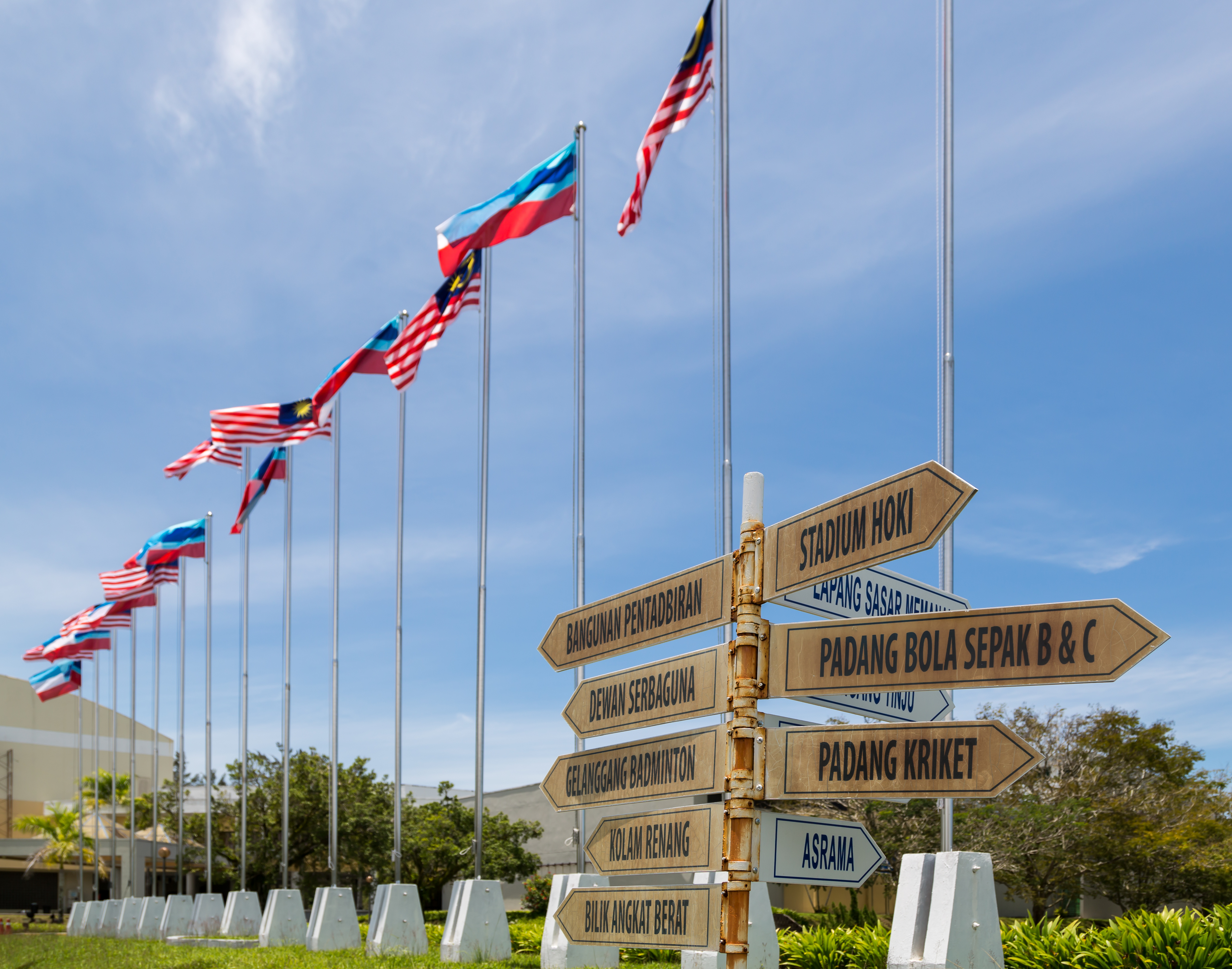
Sandakan Sport Facilities in Sandakan Sport Complex.

Another attraction is the Gomantong Caves, which is home to hundreds of thousands of swifts who build their nests high on cave walls and roofs. Other than swifts, the caves are also inhabited by millions of bats. Furthermore, the Sandakan Orchid House has a collection of rare orchids. Along the Labuk Road from Sandakan, there is a crocodile farm which houses about 1,000 crocodiles of various sizes.

The main shopping area in Sandakan is the Harbour Mall. Launched in 2003, it is located in Sandakan's new central business district and built on a bay of reclaimed land. It is part of the Sandakan Harbour Square and considered as the first modern shopping mall in the town. In 2014, a new mall project with 341 units of store has been launched and will become the second main shopping destination for Sandakan once it gets finished.

Rugby is very popular in Sandakan. Eddie Butler, a former Welsh rugby union captain described it as the "Limerick of the tropics". In 2008, the Borneo Eagles-Sabahans (a team which included a few professional Fijians) at the newly built Sandakan Rugby Club hosted a 10-a-side tournament for the eighth and last time. In 2009, the tournament was changed to seven-a-side.

== Notable residents ==
- Fung Bo-bo: Hong Kong actress
- Alex Lim: Malaysian swimmer
- Elvin Chia: Malaysian swimmer

== See also ==
- Sandakan No. 8
