= Bandar Indah Jaya =

Coordinates: 5°51′16.9″N 118°04′21.2″E

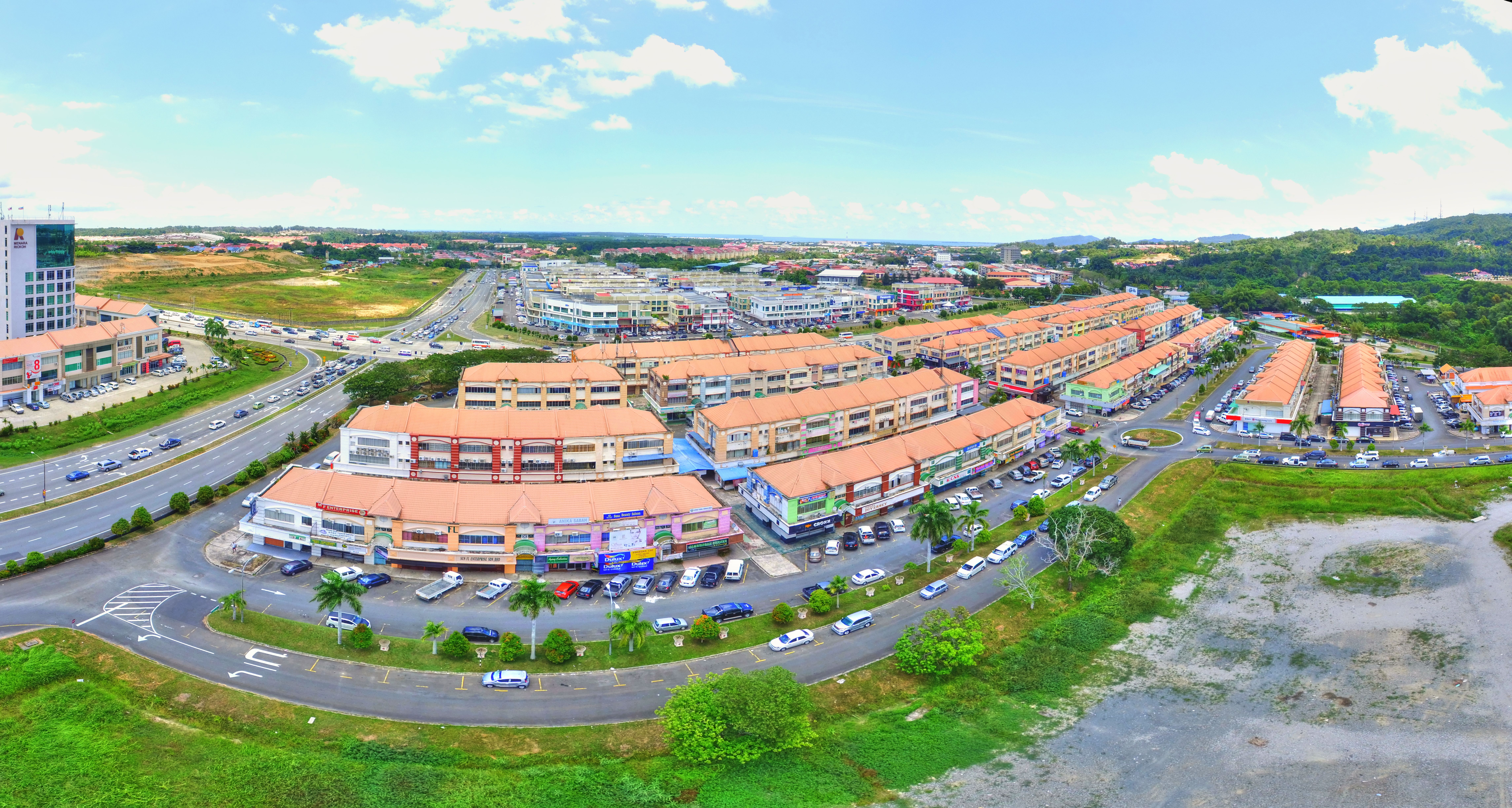
Aerial view of Bandar Indah Jaya

Bandar Indah Jaya is one of the satellite towns of Sandakan in the Malaysian state of Sabah. Located about 7 km (4.3 mi) from Sandakan town, Bandar Indah Jaya is one of the largest and busiest satellite towns in Sandakan.

It has many facilities, such as restaurants, mobile phone shops, a departmental store, a fast-food outlet (A & W), and many more facilities within Bandar Indah Jaya and its vicinity.
