= Sandakan District Mosque =

Mosque in Sandakan, Sabah, Malaysia

- Masjid Daerah Sandakan
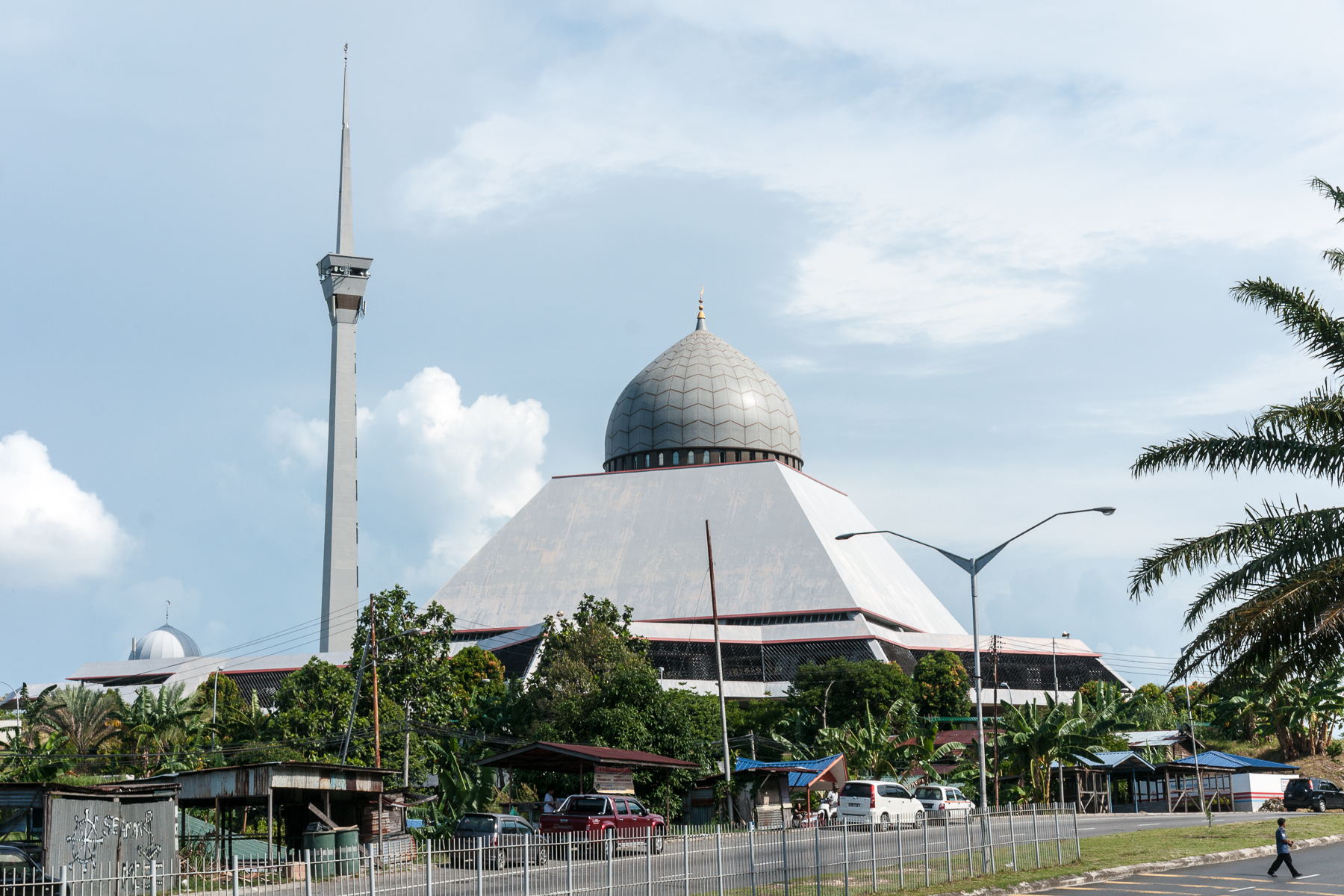

- Location within Sabah

Religion
- Affiliation: Islam
- Branch/tradition: Sunni

Location
- Location: Sandakan, Sabah, Malaysia
- Interactive map of Sandakan District Mosque
- Coordinates: 5°50′46.5″N 118°7′44.77″E

Architecture
- Architect: Dato Baharuddin Kassim
- Type: mosque
- Groundbreaking: 1985
- Completed: 1989
- Minaret: 1

The Sandakan District Mosque (Malay: Masjid Daerah Sandakan or also known as Masjid Besar Sim-Sim) is a mosque in Sandakan, Sabah, Malaysia. Built in 1985 and completed in 1989, it is the main mosque for the district of Sandakan. The mosque was officially opened in 1990.

In 2016, the mosque was visited by the Crown Prince of Perlis, Tuanku Syed Faizuddin Putra Jamalullail.

== See also ==
- Islam in Malaysia
