= Sandakan Harbour Square =

Development in Sabah Malaysia

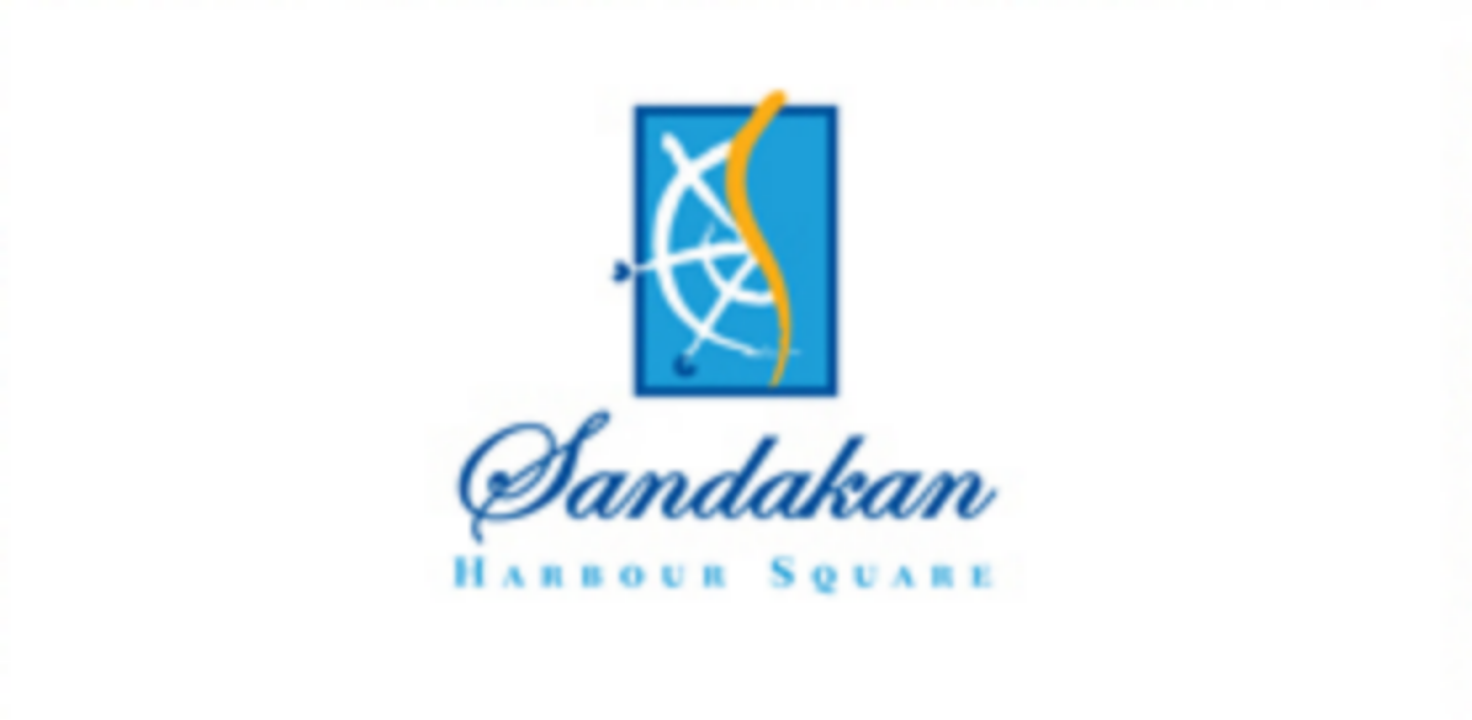
- The "Sandakan Harbour Square" logo

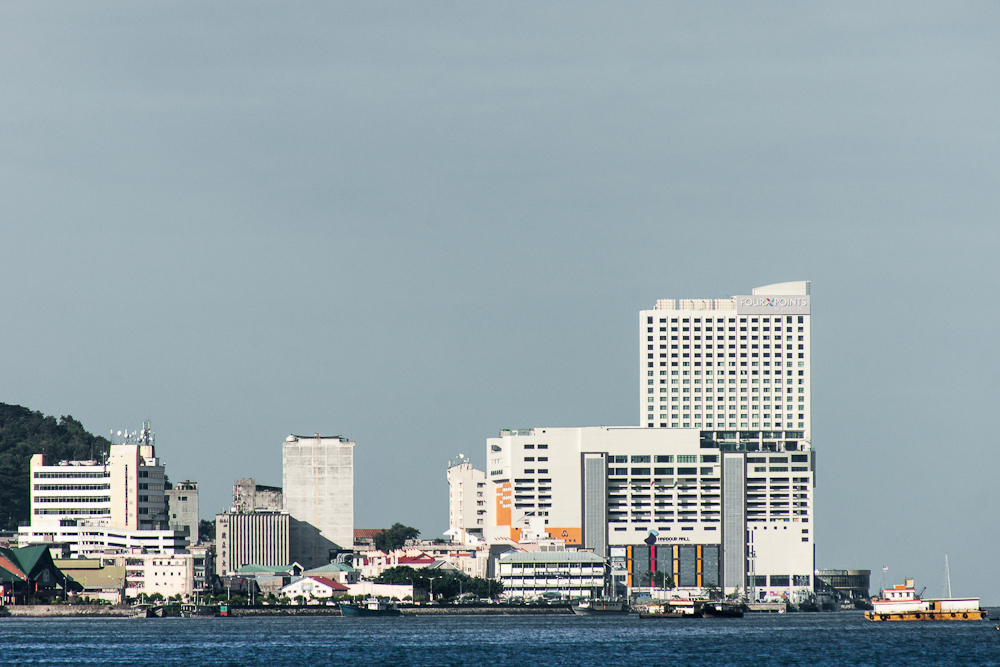
- Sandakan Harbour Square from the Sandakan Bay

Project
- Construction started: 2003
- Completed: 2012
- Status: Completed
- Developer: ICSD Ventures Sdn. Bhd.
- Architect: MAA Architect
- Operator: Aseana Properties Limited
- Website: harbourmallsandakan.com

Physical features
- Divisions: Sandakan

Location
- Location: Sandakan, Sabah, Malaysia

Area
  - Land: 4.9 ha (12 acres)

Sandakan Harbour Square (SHS) is an urban renewal project that was built on a reclaimed land in Sandakan, Malaysia. It was a project comprising commercial shops and offices, a new central market, a new city square with waterfront esplanade, a boutique hotel and a five-storey shopping mall connecting into an international class hotel.

== Geography ==
Being built strategically overlooking the Sulu Sea, the project was considered as the new central business district of the city. SHS was also set to be the heart of the city.

== Construction ==
The Harbour Square is a joint venture between Ireka and Sandakan Municipal Council. It was developed by ICSD Ventures Sdn Bhd, a subsidiary of Ireka Corp Bhd's London-listed associate Aseana Properties Ltd. and managed by Ireka Development Management Sdn Bhd. The project started in 2003, less than two years after it was first proposed. It was built on 12 acres (4.9 ha) of reclaim land. Reclamation was done 3 months after the project kicked off, adding 25% land area to the city.

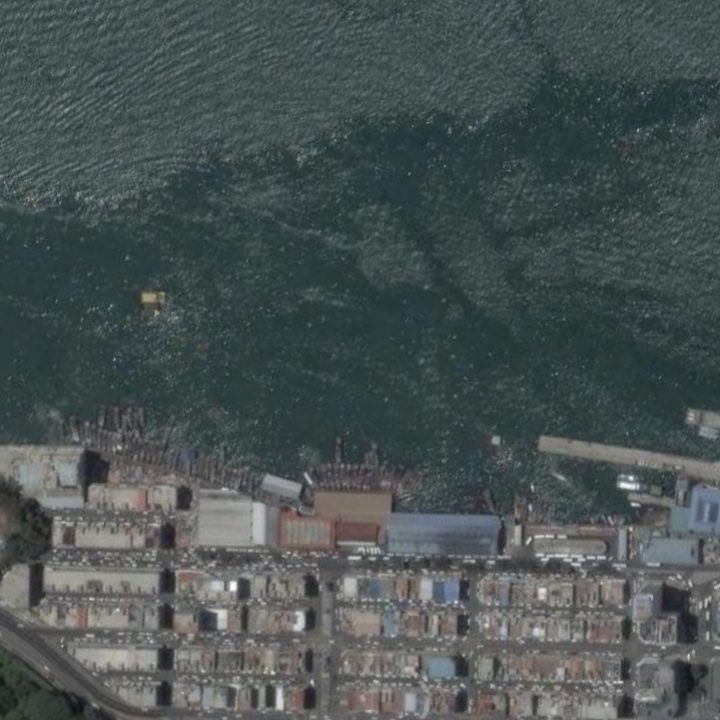
Before reclamation

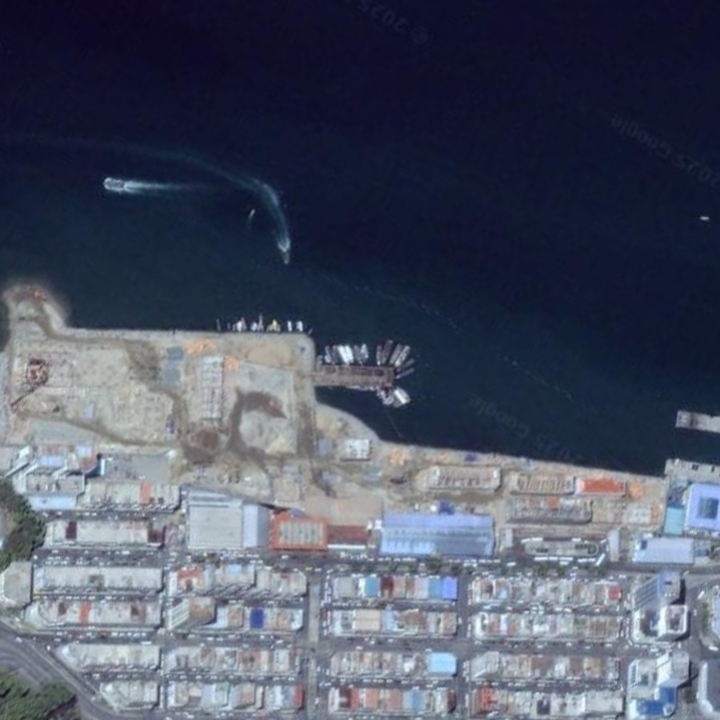
Process of reclamation

The project consists of four phases that were completed at different times. The central market, which was part of phase 1, was completed in 2006 after a groundbreaking in 2004 by the Sabah Chief Minister, Tan Sri Musa Aman.

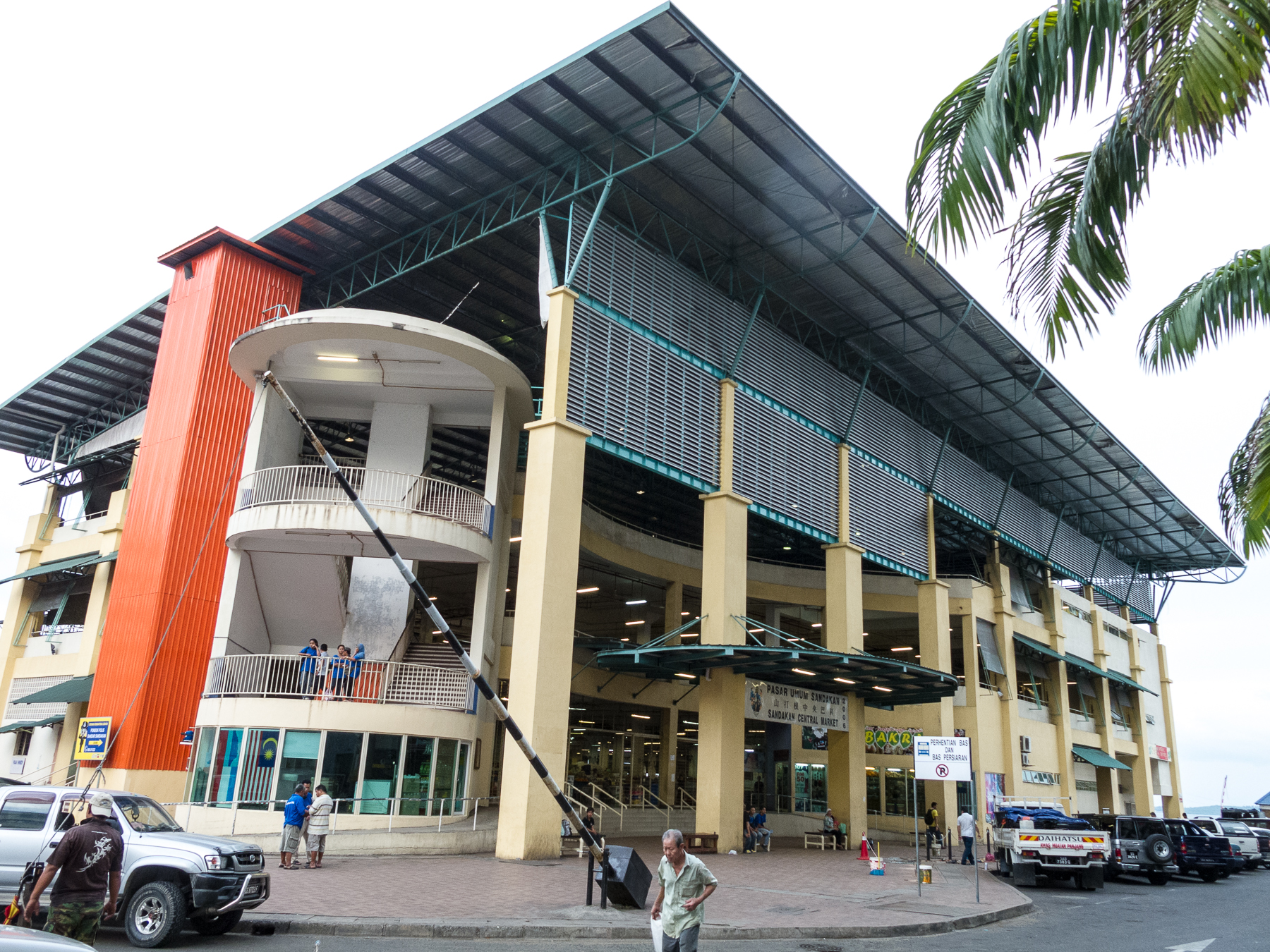
Sandakan Central Market, influence by coastal architecture

Several months after the construction of the new central market was completed, the old central market was later demolished to upgrade the area into the new shop offices.

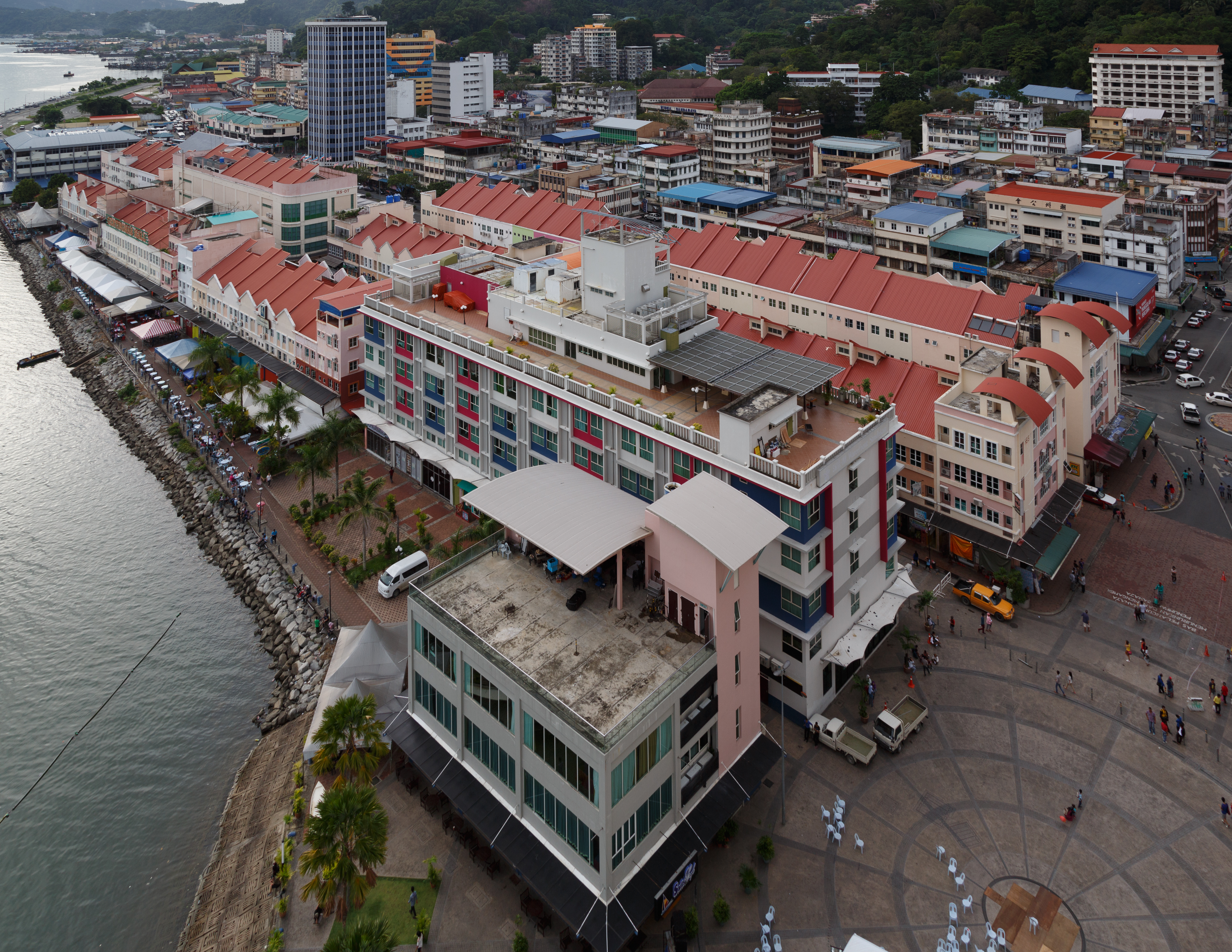
View of the shop office and the boutique hotel (The Elopura Hotel)

Phase two comprising three and four storey shop offices was completed in 2009. In addition, Sandakan Harbour Square also received an award at the Asia Pacific Property Awards in the commercial redevelopment category in 2009.

The master development, Harbour Mall and the hotel construction began in 2008.

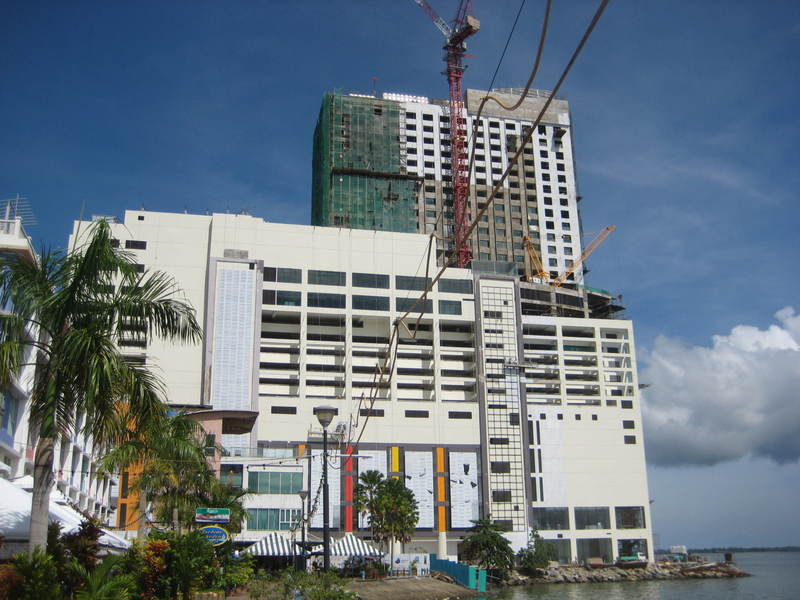
The "Harbour Mall and hotel " nearing its completion

The mall and hotel was completed and opened to the public in 2012. The mall is considered to be Sandakan's first modern shopping mall. This marks the completion of the Sandakan Harbour Square within the 10 years targeted time.

== Zones ==
Sandakan Central Market expands over 3-storeys, well equipped with a new fishing jetty. The ground floor locate the dry market and a fresh fish market that offers wide variety of local products. On the first and second floor, you can find Malay and Chinese cuisine while enjoying the view of the sea. Visitors can also explore local handcrafts and souvenirs on the first floor.

Sandakan Harbour Square are equipped with 68 three and four storey shop offices with commercial lots that currently host brands like Rip Curl, 7-Eleven, and Tealive.

Sandakan Square are located in front of the mall, a space often use for public events in the city. Alongside it lays the 1.5km waterfront esplanade.

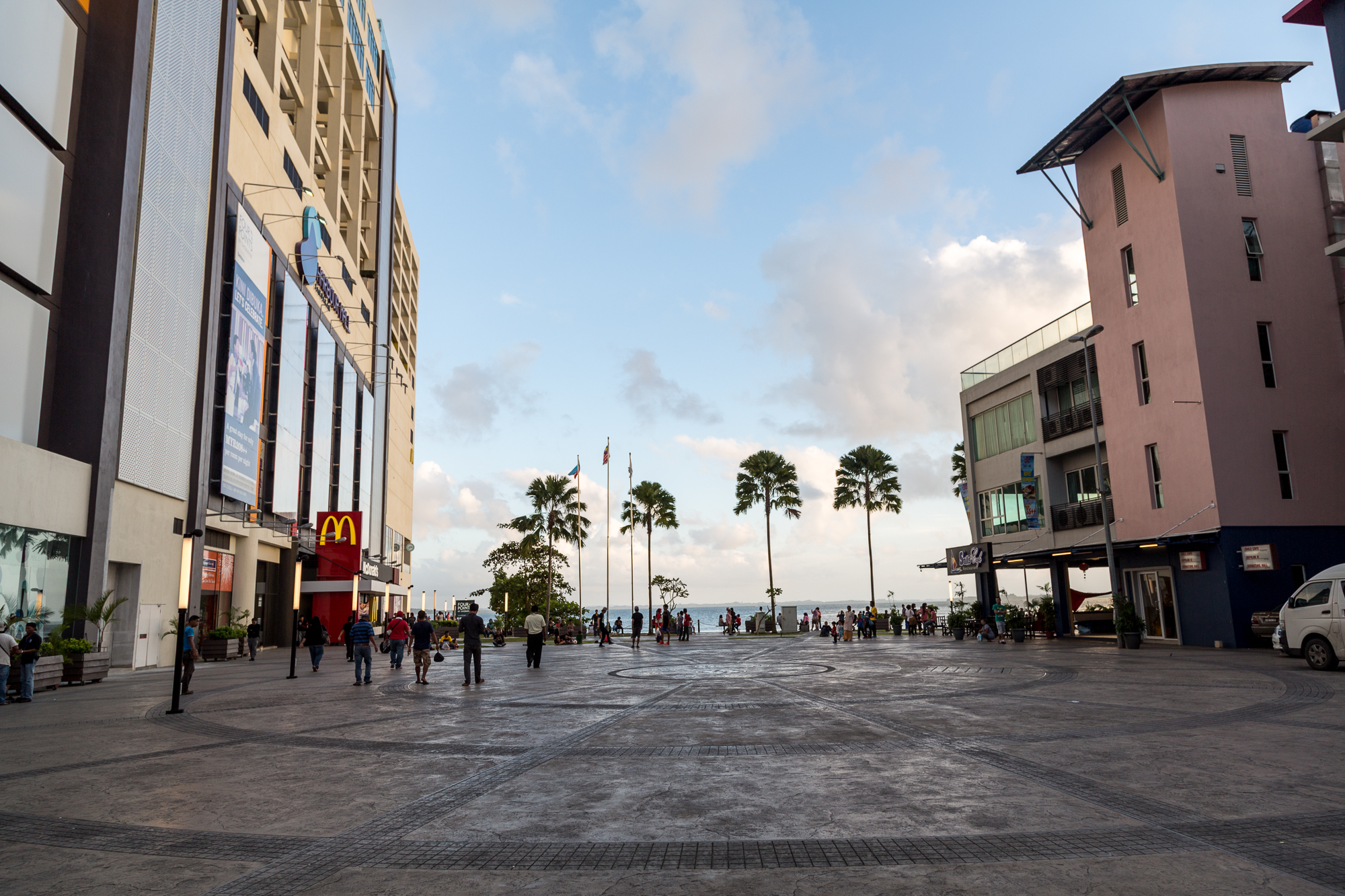
The "Harbour Square"

The boutique hotel was originally opened in 2007. In 2021, the hotel was renovated into a film-themed hotel which inspiration was taken from old Malaysian film and Hollywood glam. With 111 rooms, the hotel was named The Elopura Hotel.

The Harbour Mall Sandakan opened its doors on 16 July 2012, marking a new era for commercial experiences in Sandakan. With 200,000 sqft retail spaces, expanding over 5-level of prime spaces for retailers it became the new shopping haven for local and tourist. Sandakan Convention Centre was located on the 11th floor. Later, it was converted into a 7-screen cineplex called LFS Sandakan.

The mall was formerly managed by Ireka Development Management Sdn. Bhd. In 2020, Ireka signs demerger exercise with Aseana to separate interest which cause termination of the consulting agreement with its former Development Manager. This led Aseana to self-manage its company.

Rising above the shopping mall, reaching 26 stories sits the former Four Points by Sheraton, the only international brand hotel in the city before it was closed down in 2020.

In mid 2025, it was announced that the hotel will be reopen in 2026 under a new brand with 299 rooms. The hotel was opened 31 March 2026 under the name Ormond Sandakan, managed by the Ormond Hotel Group.

== Attractions ==
One of the nearest tourist attraction is the "Utan" sculpture that is located in front of the mall.

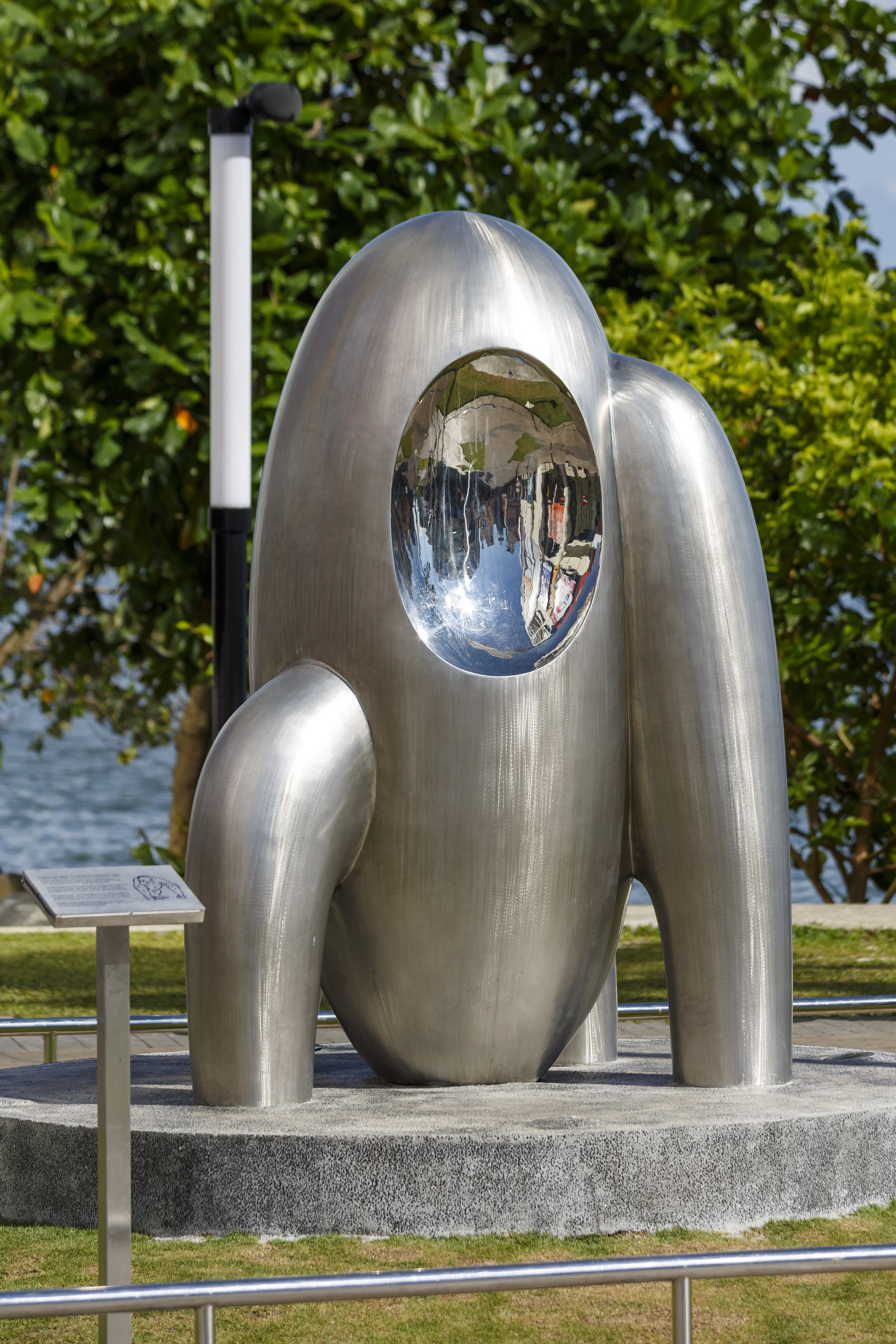
The Utan sculpture

Sandakan Heritage Trail is a walk that cover the town important and interesting sites that have contributed to the city historical past.

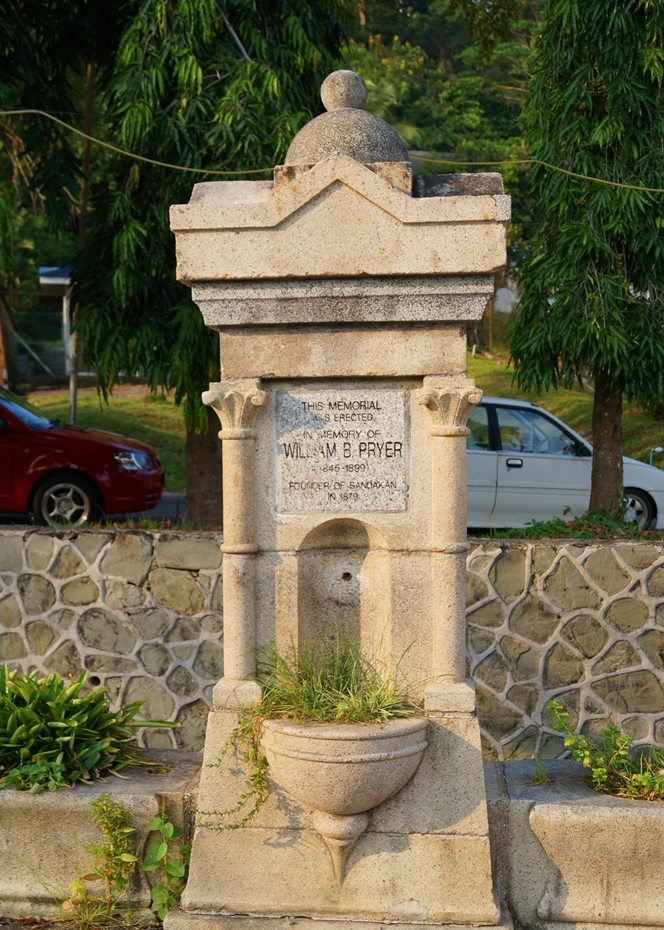
The William Pryer Monument one of the historical sites on the heritage trail

The one hour walks bring you back to the bygone era of British North Borneo over 100 years ago.

== Others ==
- Sandakan City Centre
- Sejati Walk Sandakan
- Sejati Sentral Sandakan
