= Sandakan War Monument =

World War II memorial in Sabah, Malaysia

- Tugu Peringatan Perang Sandakan
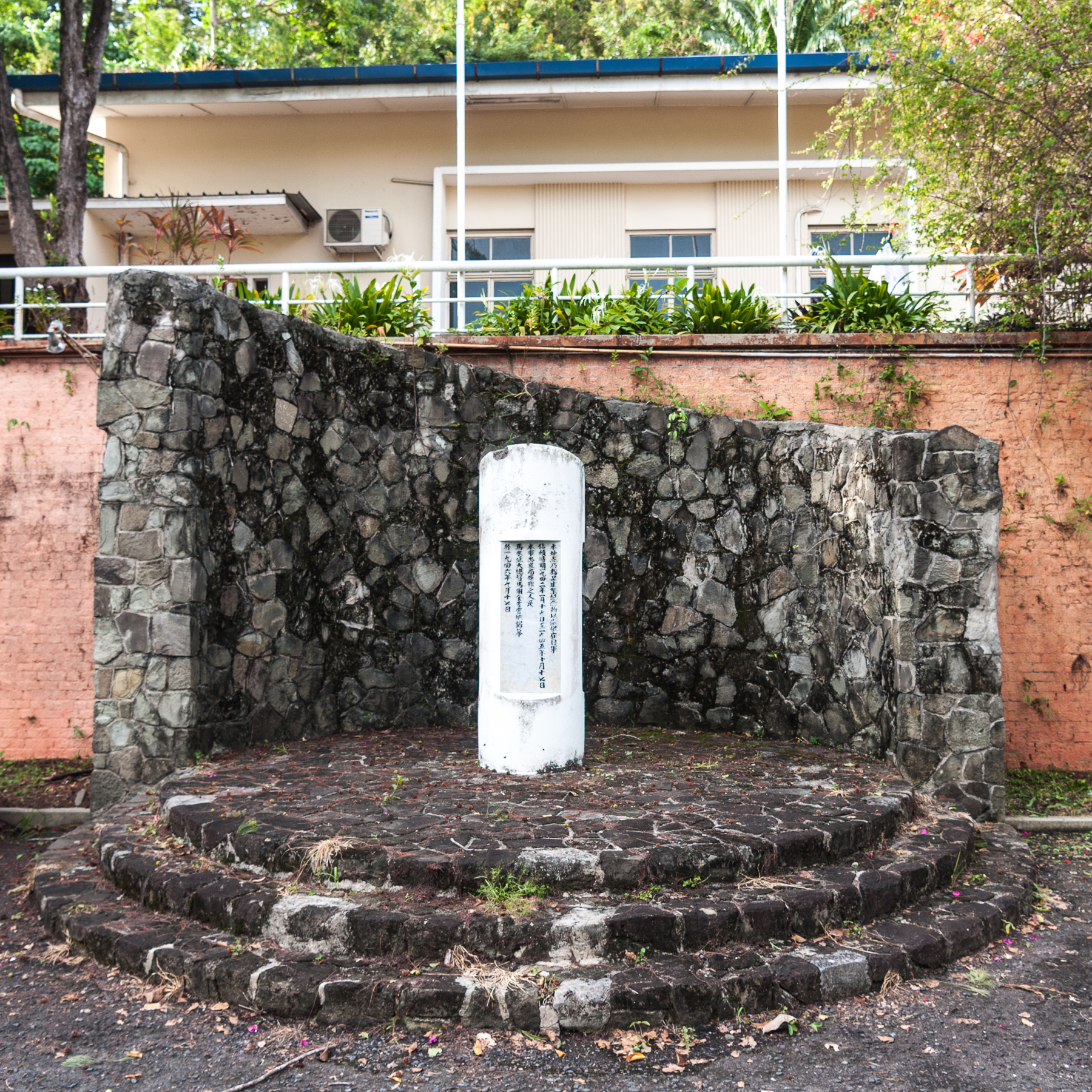
- Interactive map of Sandakan War Monument
- Location: Sandakan
- Coordinates: 5.840526°N 118.116438°E
- Type: Stele
- Dedicated to: Commemorates the town citizens who died during the Second World War

The Sandakan War Monument (Malay: Tugu Peringatan Perang Sandakan) is a monument established by the British located in the town of Sandakan, Malaysia, to commemorates the town citizens who died during the Second World War. The monument is part of the Sandakan Heritage Trails, a "Heritage Trail" which connects every historic sights of Sandakan.

== Description ==
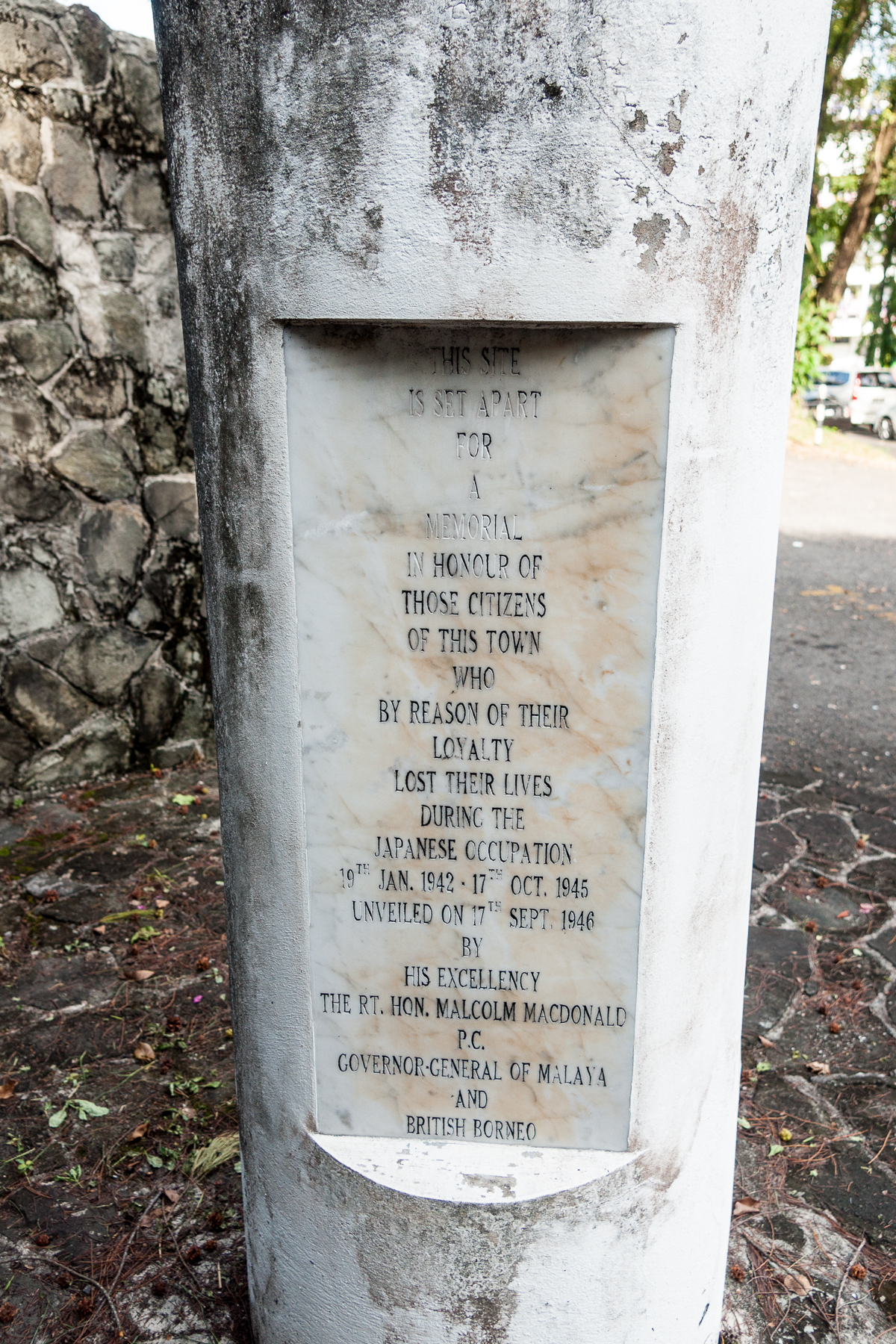
The original monument inscription.

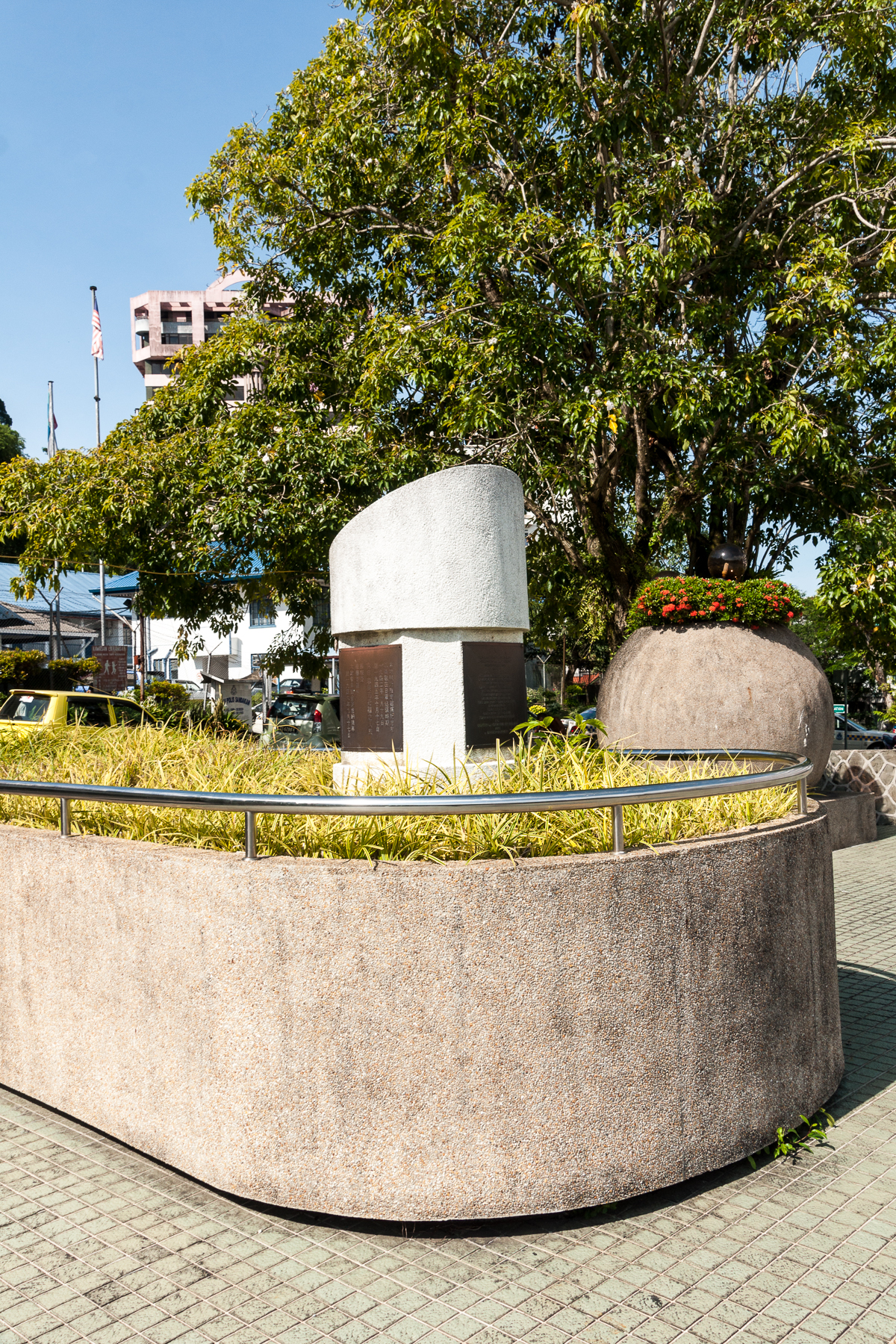
The new monument.

The monument exists in two versions. The original, a stele of marble is outside the old courthouse (Sandakan High Court). It bears an inscription in Chinese (front) and English (rear). The English inscription reads:

This Site
Is Set Apart
For
A
Memorial
In Honour Of
Those Citizens
Of This Town
Who
By Reason Of Their
Loyalty
Lost Their Lives
During The
Japanese Occupation
19th Jan. 1942 – 17th Oct. 1945
Unveiled on 17th Sept. 1946
By
His Excellency
The Rt. Hon. Malcolm MacDonald
P.C.
Governor-General Of Malaya
And
British Borneo

While the new version is located only a few dozen metres away on the MPS Square. The metal plate on this replica is provided with an identical inscription.
