= Sandakan Heritage Museum =

- Muzium Warisan Sandakan
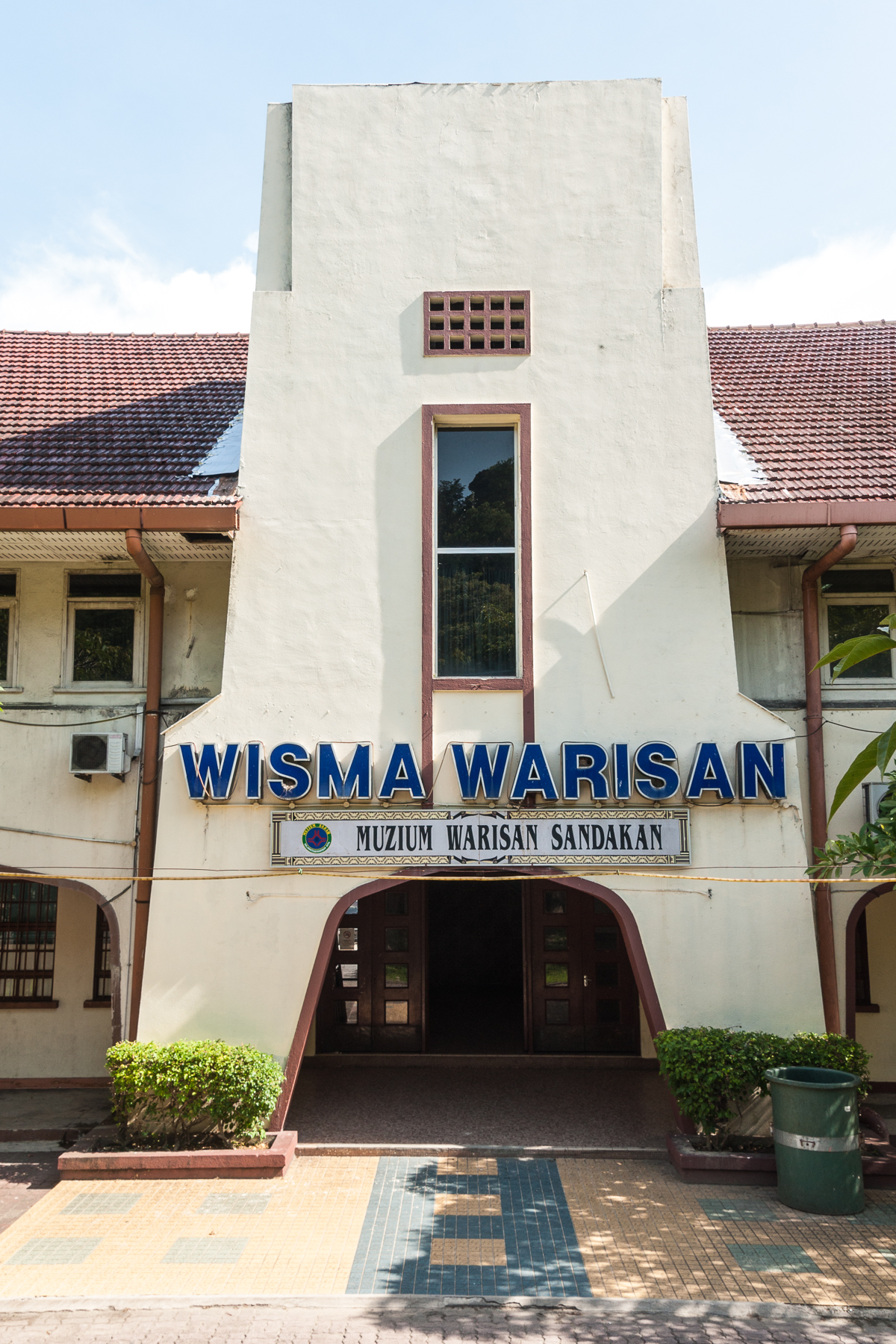
- Location: Sandakan, Sabah
- Coordinates: 5°50′23″N 118°06′58″E
- Type: Museum
- Owner: Sabah Museum

Sandakan Heritage Museum (Malay: Muzium Warisan Sandakan) is a museum located at the 1st floor of Wisma Warisan building in Sandakan of Sabah, Malaysia. The museum building is located next to the Sandakan Municipal Council and is part of the Sandakan Heritage Trail.

== Features ==
The museum sits in the 1st floor of the former British administration building for Sandakan where it showcases the pre-war and post-war history of the town. Various artefacts including barter trade items, authentic office equipment in the 1920s and traditional agricultural equipment. Portraits of local leaders and early scenes of the town are prominently displayed with the most eye-catching is the large wall mural of Sandakan in 1935 in the museum's hallway. The Martin and Osa Johnson Safari Museum in Chanute, Kansas of the United States has a relations with the museum with the digital copies of Johnson photographs related to North Borneo are returned to the museum and the authority of Sabah Museum.

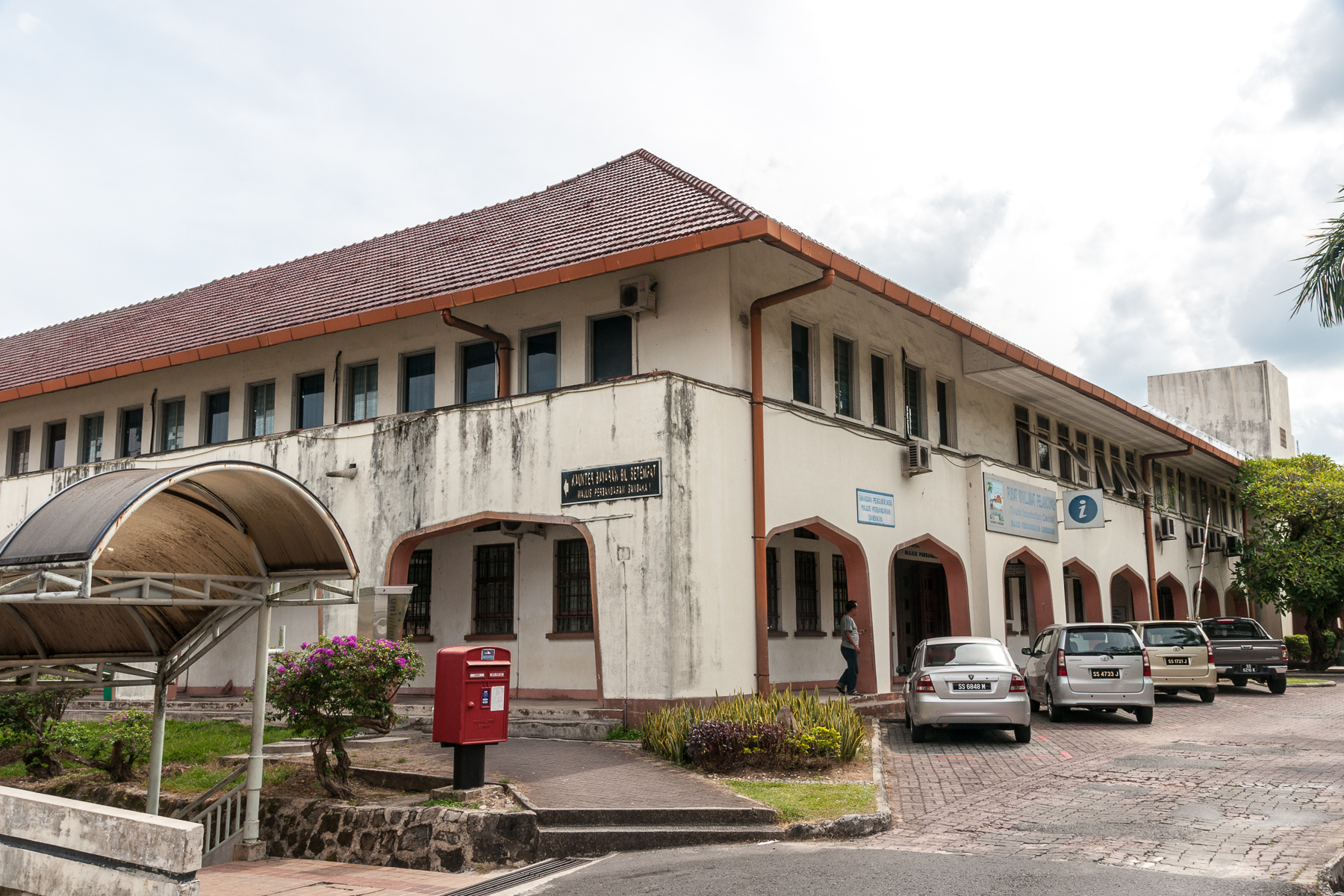
The museum building as seen from outside.

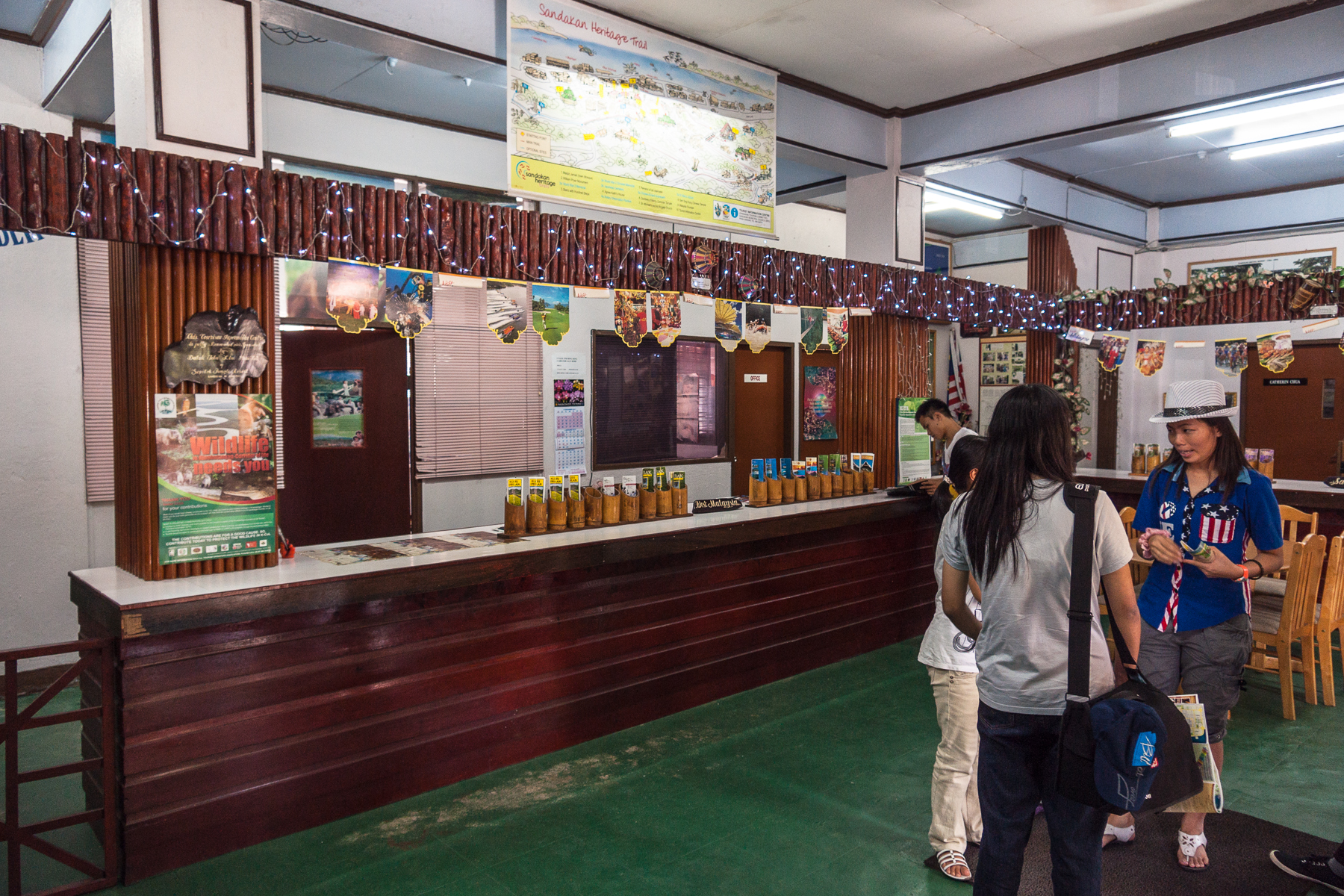
Tourist office in the building.

== See also ==
- List of museums in Malaysia
