= William Pryer Monument =

Memorial in Sandakan, Sabah, Malaysia

- Tugu Peringatan William Pryer
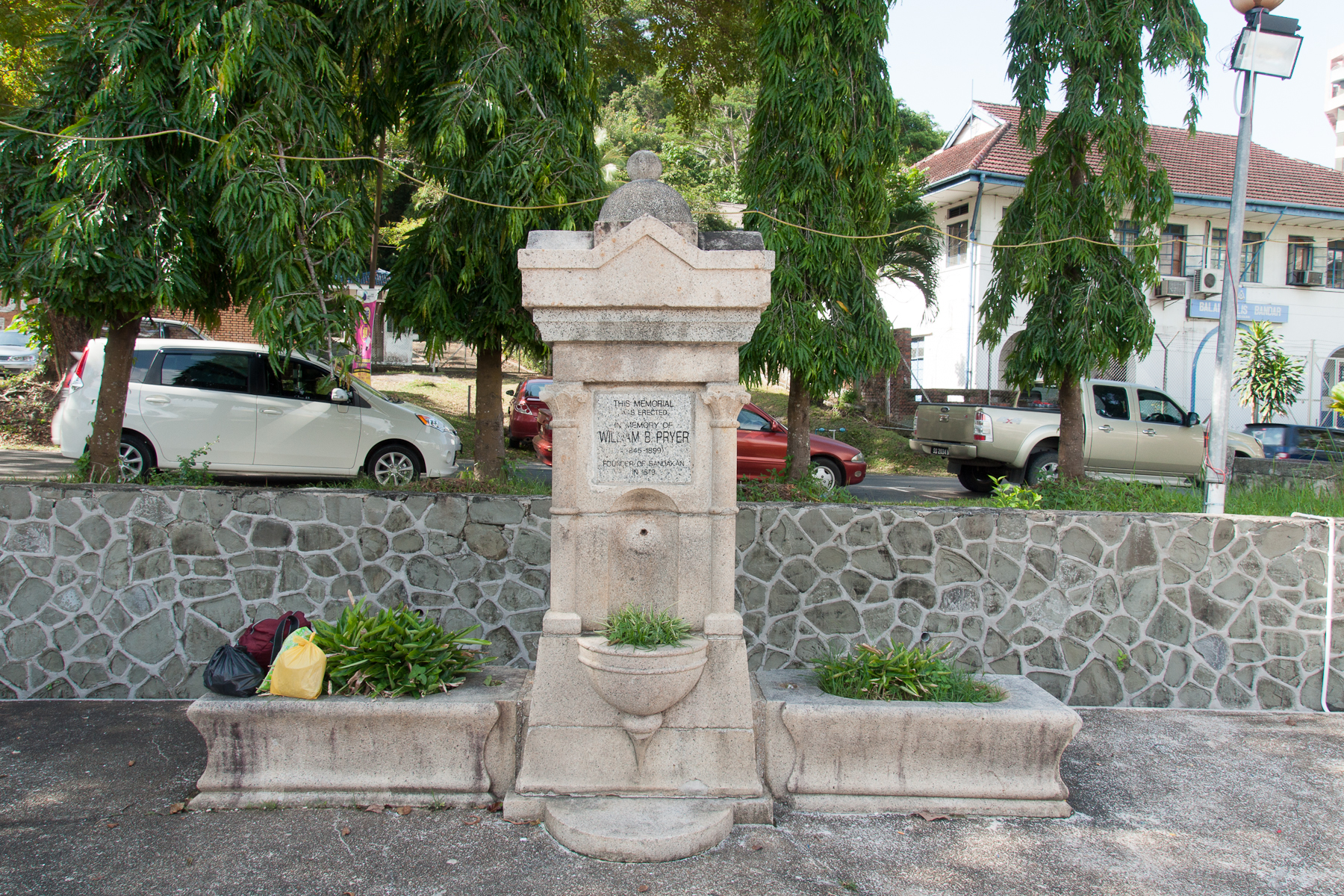
- The monument today.
- Interactive map of William Pryer Monument
- Location: Sandakan
- Coordinates: 5.840346°N 118.116480°E
- Dedicated to: William Burgess Pryer

William Pryer Monument (Malay: Tugu Peringatan William Pryer) is a monument that stand in the Malaysian town of Sandakan as a memory of the founder, William Burgess Pryer. It is part of the Sandakan Heritage Trails, a trail which connects all the historic sights in Sandakan.

== History ==
The monument site changed frequently. In the 1950s, the monument stood on a square that today known as the site for the Sandakan Municipal Council. In early 1960s, the monument was located near a field and later been relocated again when Sandakan North Road was converted into a four-lane road.

Its current location is on the "MPS Square", fronting the Municipal Council building along with other monument such as the Chartered Company Memorial after the transformation of the site, which was a former hockey field.

== Description ==
The granite fountain is divided into a centre part with memorial inscription, gargoyles and two flanking fountain troughs. The memorial inscription reads:

This Memorial
was erected
in Memory of
William B. Pryer
1845–1899
Founder of Sandakan
in 1879
