= Chartered Company Monument =

Memorial in Sandakan, Sabah, Malaysia

- Tugu Syarikat Berkanun
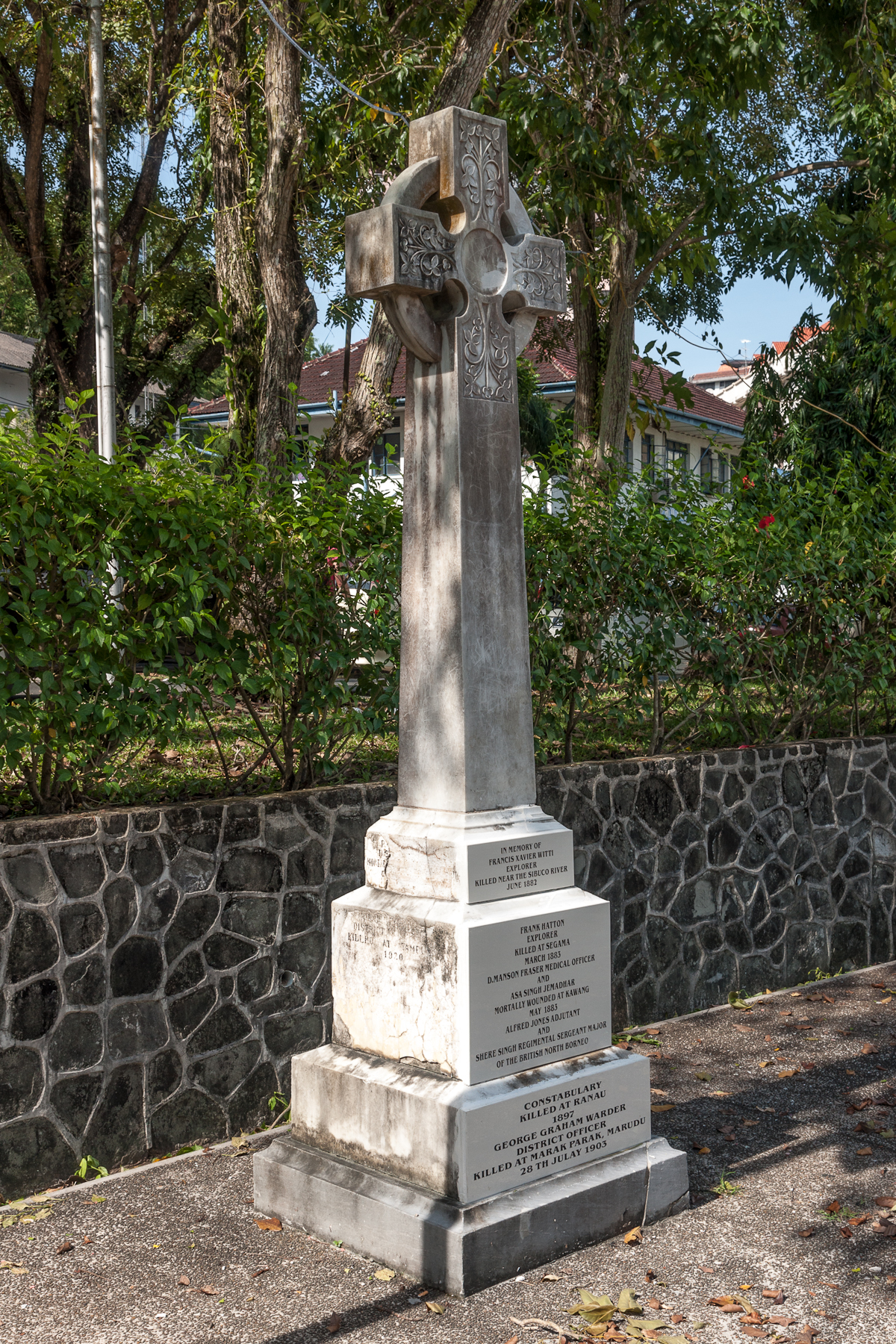
- The monument today.
- Interactive map of Chartered Company Monument
- Location: Sandakan
- Coordinates: 5°50′26″N 118°06′59″E
- Dedicated to: British servicemen or employees who were killed at the end of the 19th century.

The Chartered Company Monument (Malay: Tugu Syarikat Berkanun) is a monument in the town of Sandakan in Sabah, Malaysia dedicated to the British servicemen or employees who were killed at the end of the nineteenth century. Two of the men listed were members of the British North Borneo Constabulary. The monument was built by the British North Borneo Company and part of the Sandakan Heritage Trails, a trail which connects the historic sights of Sandakan.

== History ==
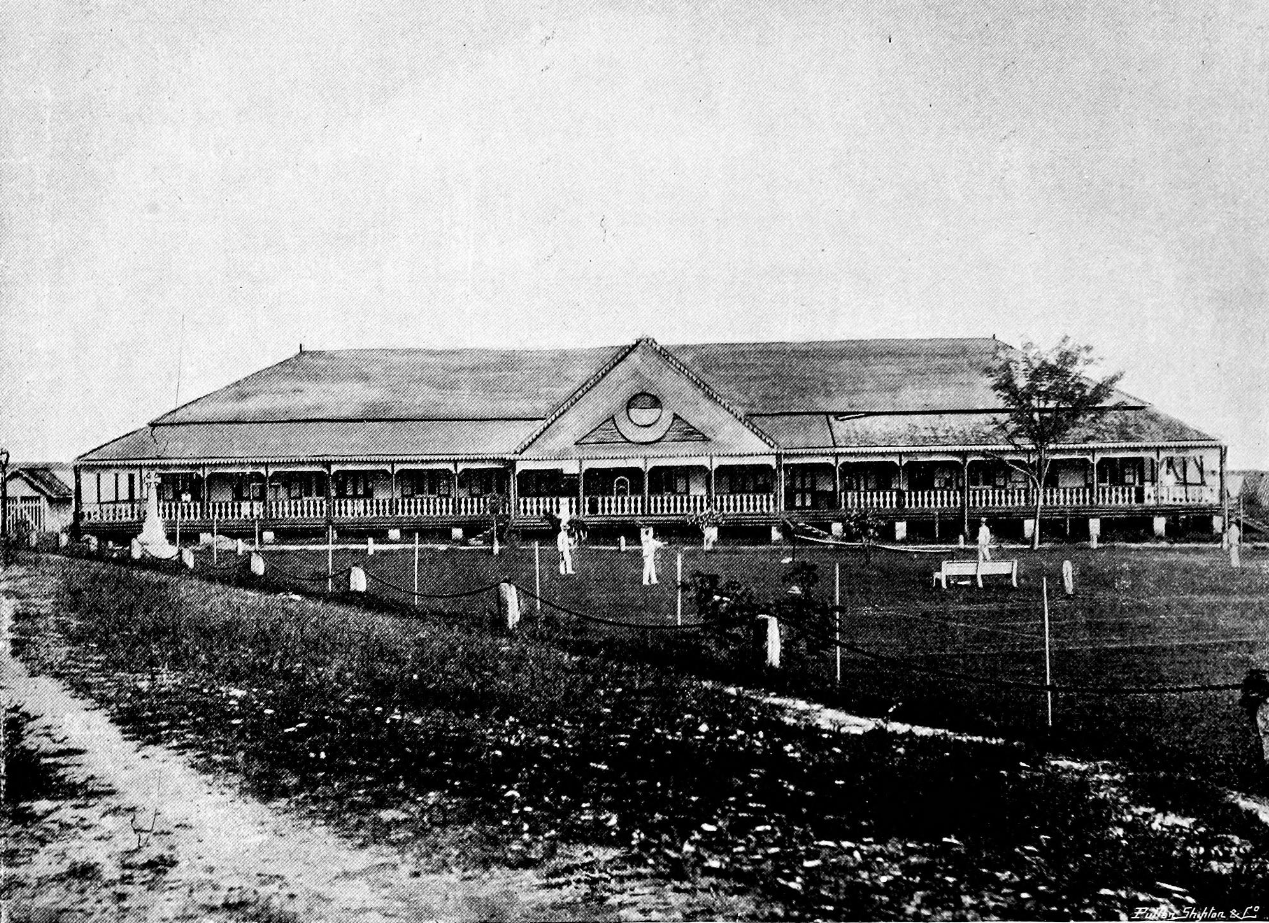
The monument (at the left) in front of the North Borneo Chartered Company Government Office, circa 1895.

To commemorate the death of a British explorer in March 1883, Frank Hatton who died during his expedition to Segama River, the North Borneo Chartered Company announced the establishment of a memorial shortly after his death. The plan was also probably because the body of Hatton cannot be sent home to England. Another early British pioneer and explorer, Franz Xavier Wittisheim already been commemorated in June 1882 at the Sibuco River after he was killed during a strain with the Muruts.

Shortly before the completion of his book "North Borneo – Explorations and Adventures on the equator" in 1885, his father learned that the company's plans had changed:

Since those closing notes were written and before and this memorial column is finished, the subscribing officials of the Company have ordered three other names to be engraved upon the pedestal [...]

By the will of the officials, three other names been placed on the stone. A Celtic cross was later added as a memorial to the dead. William Hood Treacher, the Governor of North Borneo noted in his 1891 memoirs: "A memorial cross has been erected in Sandakan for Witti, Hatton, de Fontaine and the officers and soldiers of the Sikh who lost their lives in the service of the Government".

=== Inscription ===
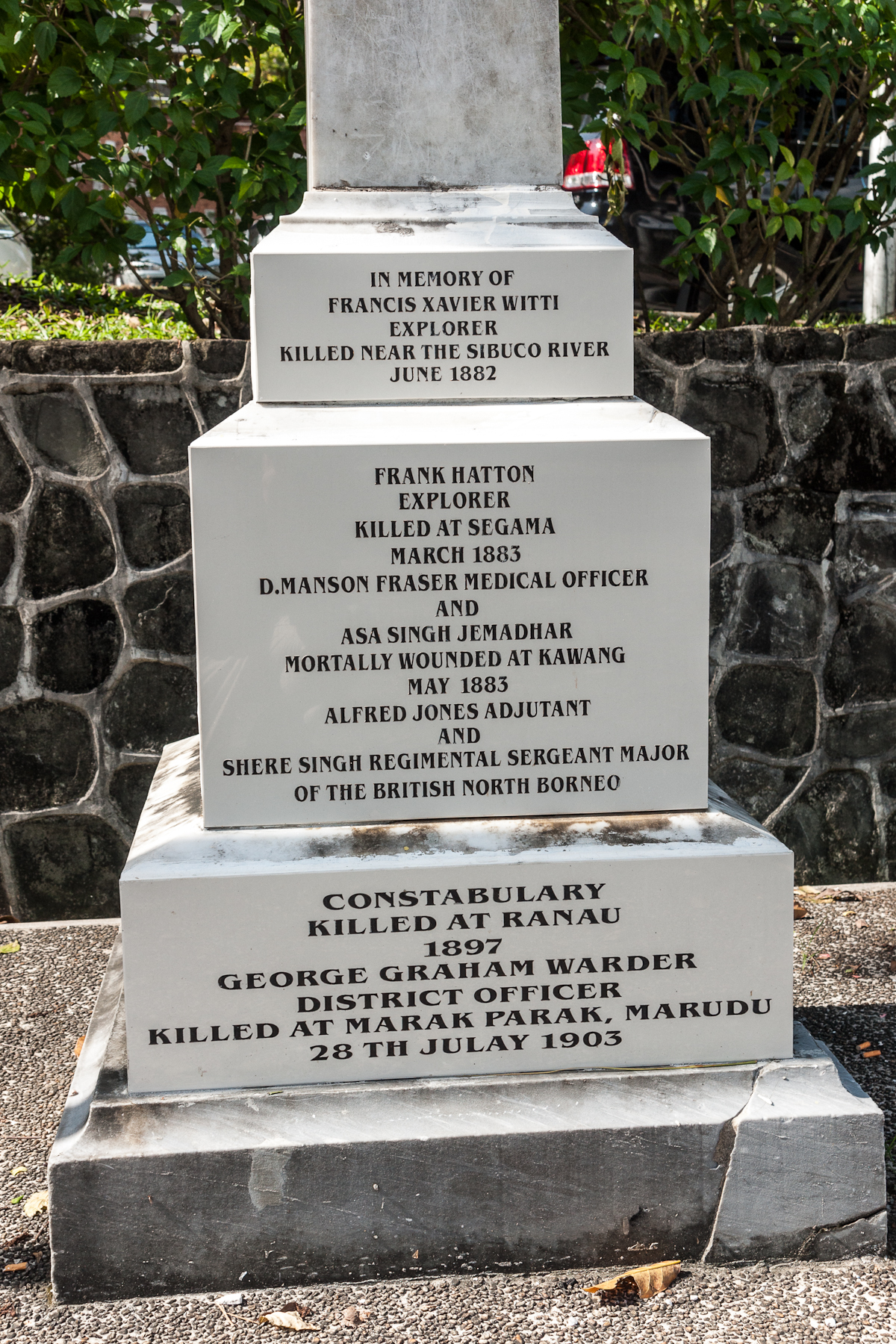
Inscription on the front side.

The monument has the shape of a Celtic cross on a four-stepped rectangular base. The front panels and the side plates bear inscriptions with the names of deceased official of the Chartered Company. Today, the front site has been renovated and the typeface was slightly modernised. The memorial inscription on the front reads:

In Memory Of
Francis Xavier Witti
Explorer
Killed Near the Sibuco River
June 1882
Frank Hatton
Explorer
Killed at Segama
March 1883
D. Manson Fraser Medical Officer
And
Asa Singh Jemadhar
Mortally Wounded At Kawang
May 1883
Alfred Jones Adjutant
And
Shere Singh Regimental Sergeant Major
Of the British North Borneo
Constabulary
Killed At Ranau
1897
George Graham Warder
District Officer
Killed at Marak Parak, Marudu
28th Julay 1903

The monument is located between 1885 and 1890.

During the renovation of the commemorative inscription, there is an error. The year "1883" mistakenly described for the assassination of Dr. Manson Fraser and Asa Sing Jemadhar rather than killed during a deadly attack in Kawang on 12 May 1885.

=== Site ===
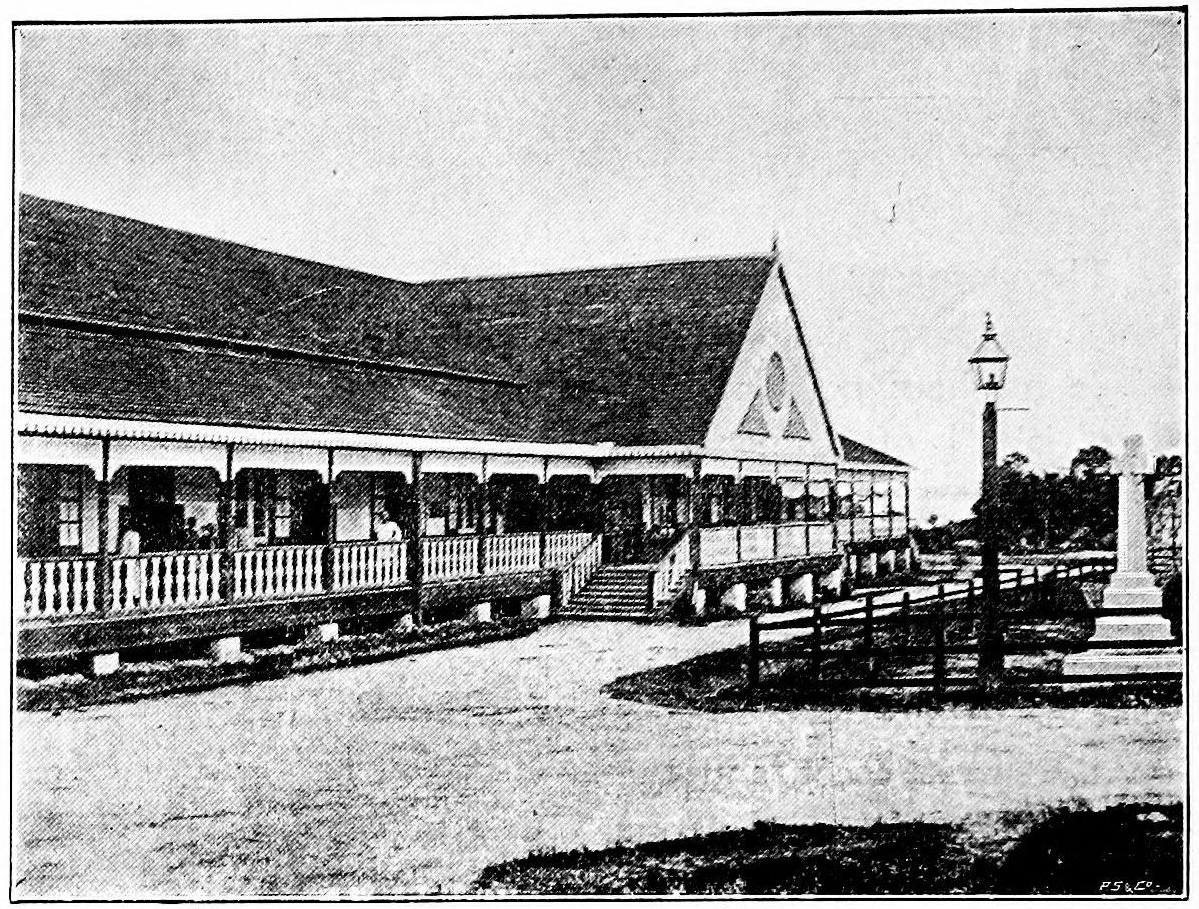
Historic site of the former British government building in Sandakan with the monument stand in the front.

Old pictures of the government building show the Celtic cross prominently in front of the district office. Also on images from the estate of the American documentary filmmaker Martin and Osa Johnson, the monument is situated in front of the government building. Images from the 1960s show that the place had not changed since then. During the construction of the new municipal administration building, the monument was placed in storage. Its current location is in a prominent spot in the MPS Square, fronting the MPS (Sandakan Municipal Council) and the Heritage Buildings as well as the Court House.
