= All Saints Secondary School =

- Sekolah Menengah All Saints 沙巴诸圣中学
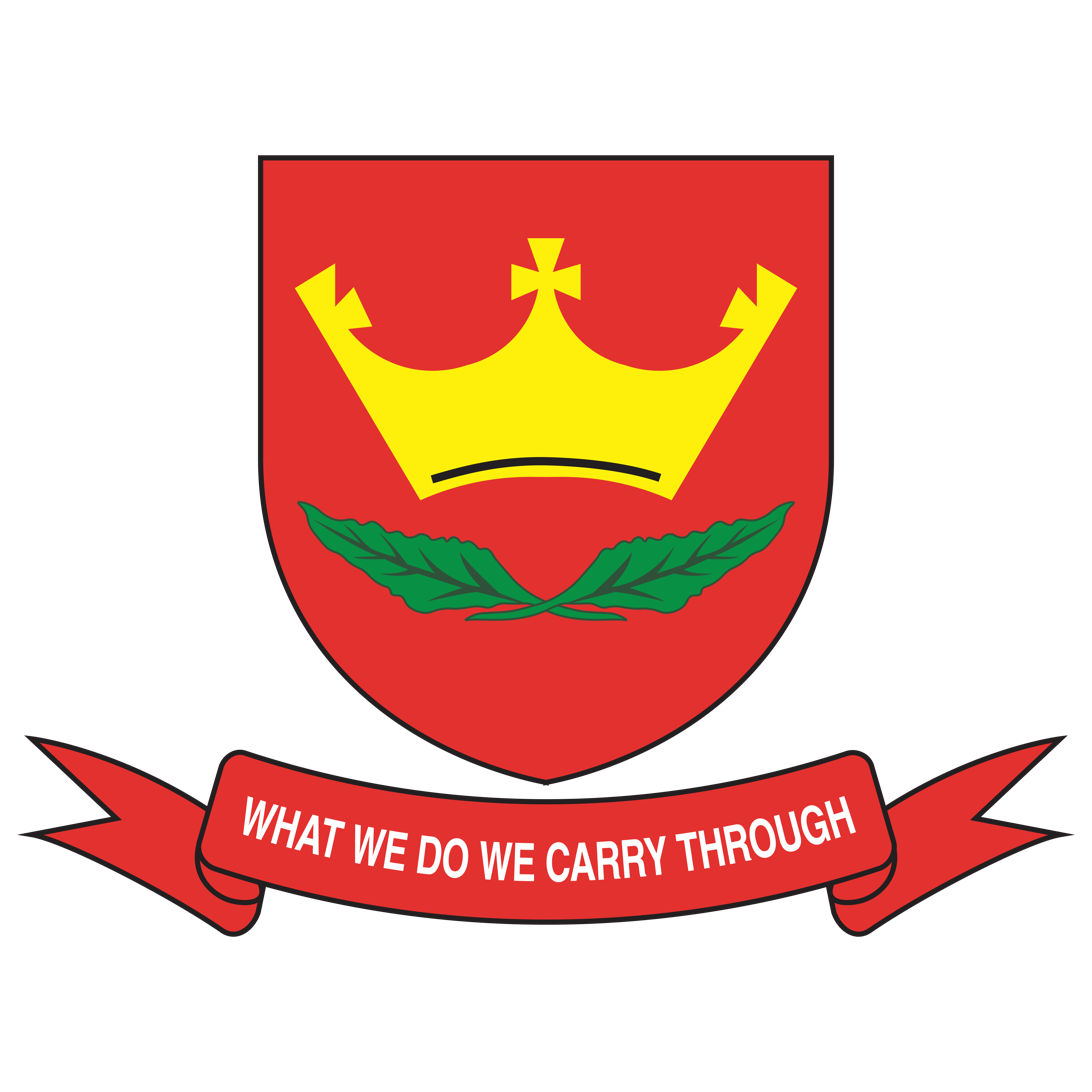

Location
- Jalan Teluk Likas; Likas; Kota Kinabalu, Sabah, 88805; Malaysia
- Coordinates: 5°59′27.5″N 116°06′24.1″E

Information
- School type: Semi-National Secondary School
- Motto: Quod facimus id perficimus (What we do, We carry through)
- Religious affiliation: Christian
- Denomination: Anglican Communion
- Established: 1 April 1903, 22 December 1903 (opened)
- School board: Diocese of Sabah
- School district: Kota Kinabalu
- School code: XFE4001
- Headmistress: Dr. Mary Gambidau
- Grades: Bridge class; Form 1–3 (Lower secondary); Form 4–5 (Upper secondary); Form 6 (Pre-University)
- Gender: Co-ed
- Age: 13 to 17
- Enrollment: 1500+
- Language: Malay, English
- Classrooms: Jasmine, Lavender, Cherry, Tulip, Violet, Petunia
- Houses: Collier, Paisley, Henthorne, Leggatt and Rusted
- Yearbook: The Saint
- Affiliations: Anglican Diocese of Sabah
- Website: https://allsaintskkedu.wordpress.com

Sekolah Menengah Kebangsaan All Saints is a single-session secondary school located in Jalan Teluk Likas of Kota Kinabalu, Sabah, Malaysia. It is also known as All Saints Secondary School and SM All Saints for short. The school was opened in 1903 when Kota Kinabalu was known as Jesselton, making it one of the oldest schools in Kota Kinabalu.

The current principal of the school is Dr. Mary Gambidau.

== History ==
All Saints Secondary School is a part of the Anglican Diocese of Sabah. The development of Anglican Church schools was inspired by foreign settlers to provide education to their children. The Diocese also owns other secondary schools, primary schools and kindergartens in Sabah and also in West Malaysia (with joint ownership along with its sister diocese known as the Diocese of West Malaysia).

=== Early days ===
All Saints was built on 1 April 1903 as one of the earliest schools in Kota Kinabalu (Jesselton). Its humble beginning was in a borrowed government building that served as an office. The school was officially declared open by Governor Sir E.W. Birch and Lady Birch on 22 December 1903 and it was firstly named as King Edward VII School after the then-reigning King of Great Britain and the British Empire.

King Edward VII School at that time, under the charge of Chai Ah Soon, was basically a one-man show, for he doubled as the headmaster and form teacher. It started with only about 30 students, all boys and mostly Chinese, and they were divided into five groups ranging from standard one to five. The students learned simple arithmetic, English grammar, reading, writing and Bible studies.

=== Move to Karamunsing ===
On 1 September 1909, King Edward VII School was moved to a land at Karamunsing, granted by the Court of Directors of the British North Borneo Company. The site of the school was moved to Karamunsing in 1910. The new school was built of wood, on stilts over the swamp.

=== The birth of All Saints School ===
World War I (1914-1918) had a big impact on King Edward VII School. The government had to stop its financial assistance and parents were unable to pay for the schooling expenses. Thus, the school board temporarily closed the school. On 1 February 1923, Rev. C. J. Collis reopened the school and renamed it as All Saints School, after the church where he served. He was the headmaster of the school then. In 1923, the 1st Jesselton (Scout) Patrol was formed by Rev. C. J. Collis in All Saints School. Boarding facilities became available in All Saints on 1 May 1930. In December 1934, Cambridge University Local Examinations were held in All Saints School for the first time in Jesselton.

=== Move to Likas ===
During World War II (1939-1945), All Saints School had to be closed again. It reopened in 1947, as a primary school with secondary classes (19 students in secondary one and seven students in secondary two). In that same year, it was reopened as a co-educational school. In 1951, it reverted to boys-only. With the growing number of students, All Saints had to move again to a new location in Likas. In June 1953, the Governor of North Borneo, Sir Ralph Hone laid the foundation stone for building All Saints' one-storey block. The building was officially declared open on the 1 July 1954 by Sir Roland Turnbull. By the year 1954, girls were admitted to secondary classes. The boys' hostel was built in 1955 and a second hostel was built in 1963 for students from other parts of Sabah.

=== Growth ===
All Saints was the first school in Sabah to teach pure science for Form 4 and 5 in 1958 and also the first to have a pure science laboratory which is the Chemistry Lab. In 1959, the Cambridge Local Examinations Committee granted the school 'A' status; this gave it the right to conduct its own practical examination in science. It was the first school in Sabah to attain this status. In 1962, Bridge class and Form 6 were introduced. All Saints was the first school to start the Form 6 arts class.

=== School house ===
The school has a house system.

=== Progress ===
On 15 August 1982, Mr. Teo Then Wah became principal of All Saints. During his tenure, a new multi-purpose hall was envisioned. The ground-breaking ceremony was held on 28 August 1983 by Rev. Cannon E.C.W. Rusted, OBE, MA. On the same day, the foundation stone of the new multipurpose hall was laid by the Anglican Bishop of the Diocese of Sabah, Rt. Rev. Datuk Luke H.S. Chhoa. On 8 November 1986, the occupation certificate of the All Saints hall was handed to Rev. Canon Lee by the then-president of the Kota Kinabalu Municipal Council, Datuk Peter D. Cheong. During Mr. Teo's time in office, a five-storey block was built.

On 14 October 1992, the ground-breaking ceremony was officiated by then-state cabinet minister, Datuk Wilfred Bumburing. Simultaneously, the Anglican Bishop of the Diocese of Sabah, Rt. Rev. Datuk Yong Ping Chung also laid the foundation stone for the new building. The five-storey classroom block was completed in June 1995. It was named Wisma All Saints.

Teo Then Wah retired on 10 September 2000; he was the longest-serving principal in All Saints' history.

=== 21st century ===
Mr. Ronnie Khoo became principal in 2001.

=== The school's first headmistress ===
The school's first woman principal, Datin Lorna Mathews, served the school in 2003, when it celebrated its 100th anniversary. During her tenure the administration office and the staff rooms were renovated and expanded. She also developed the Form 6 Block, the workshop, the school archive, the conference room, the chapel, the new grandstand, the covered walkway and the installation of the closed-circuit television camera (CCTV). She upgraded all of the students' and teachers' washrooms, the classrooms, the floor tiling and improved the school landscape. In addition, she had initiated Form 6 Graduation Ceremony and made the Prefects Installation Ceremony a special function on its own.

== Academics ==
The school offers basic and advanced secondary courses. Students have the core classes of maths, science, Malay language, English, history, Islamic education (for Muslim students), and moral education (for non-Muslim students). Non-core classes such as geography, physical and health education, visual arts, music, living skills, Chinese, Kadazan-Dusun and Tamil languages are also offered to the students as elective and optional subjects.

Students in the higher secondary however, are offered elective classes according to their chosen streams. Elective classes include Add Maths, biology, chemistry, physics, accountancy, etc. Students in All Saints Pre-University (Form 6) will enrol as Lower 6 students then re-enrol as Upper 6 students. Form 6 students are offered the Science stream and Arts stream.

== School magazine ==
The Saint

The first school magazine, The Saint, was published in 1952. In 1957, the Rotary Club of Jesselton donated a second-hand printing press to the school and a large quantity of type blocks was donated by a firm in Sheffield, England. The school printed its own magazine from then till 1969. Presently, the school magazine has become the school's yearbook and selected students are assigned to the Editorial Board to publish the yearbook.

== International relations ==
=== Global Generation Programme ===
==== Japan ====
All Saints has international links with the Arima Senior High School, in Sanda, Hyōgo, Japan through the Global Generation Programme which started in 2005 and continues bi-annually. The students from Arima Senior High School come from Japan to visit the school, learn the differences between Japanese and Malaysian life and culture here in Sabah, led by selected All Saints students. Students who are selected to participate in the student-exchange programme travel to Arima Senior High School in Japan, accompanied by teachers. The bi-annual programme allows All Saints students to experience the life and culture of Japan and to make Japanese friends.

==== Korea ====
In 2017, All Saints School started an international student-exchange programme with Bisan Middle School from Anyang, Gyeonggi, South Korea.

=== Sakura Science Exchange Programme ===
Since 2015, All Saints School has established international relations with Hokkaido Sapporo Keisei High School in Japan through the Sakura Science Programme to promote establishment of a mutual research scheme and a high school-university international partnership (Rakuno Gakuen University of Hokkaido, Japan and Universiti Malaysia Sabah), to help raise the next generation who will contribute to solving Asian challenges of biodiversity and water resources. This programme is fully sponsored by the Japan Science and Technology Agency (JST).

Each year, five students who have excelled in their academics are selected to participate in this programme. These students spend a week in Sapporo, Japan accompanied by a teacher. Subsequently, selected students from Sapporo visit Kota Kinabalu. Students from both nations are also given the opportunity to exchange cultures and traditions during the stay with their foster families.

=== Krimbati Program ===
In January 2019, All Saints School carried out the Krimbati program. Krimbati comes from a Kwijau word for orangutan-like creatures. The aim of the programme was to spread awareness about the yaws disease which was common in some tropical countries. The school held a competition open to all students that had them forming groups of up to eight people to create a video on any subject, as long as the video had a moral lesson. Team "Peraturan Tigopulumpat" won the first place and a prize of RM100.

== Nearby landmarks ==
Nearby Likas Stadium is usually used for sports training by students from All Saints School. It is also the venue for the school's annual Sports Day.

== Notable alumni ==
- Chong Kah Kiat – former Sabah state chief minister
- Wlifred Mojilip Bumburing – former Sabah state cabinet minister
- Musa Aman – former Sabah state chief minister and current governor since 2025
- Alex Lim Keng Liat – Malaysian swimmer
- Christina Liew – former Sabah deputy chief minister and current state tourism minister
