= St. Michael's Secondary School =

St. Michael's Secondary School, Sandakan
- Malay: Sekolah Menengah Kebangsaan St. Michael, Sandakan

Location
- Peti Surat 239; 90702 Sandakan, Sabah; Malaysia; 5.8410°N 118.1127°E

Information
- Type: Secondary school
- Motto: Meliora Sequimur Malay: Contohilah Teladan Yang Baik
- Established: 5 October 1888
- Founder: Rev. William Henry Elton
- Principal: Felicia Michael Asang
- Grades: Form One – Form Five
- Enrollment: Approx. 699 (2026)
- Houses: Brown, Elton, Fu, Sparrow
- Colour
- Affiliations: Parish of St. Michael and All Angels

St. Michael's Secondary School is a single-session secondary school located in the city of Sandakan, state of Sabah, East Malaysia. It is located at the foot of Elton Hill which is at the hub of the city on the Churches Road. Established on 5^{th} October 1888, it stands as one of the oldest schools in Sandakan and East Malaysia.

== History ==
St. Michael's Secondary School is a part of the Anglican Diocese of Sabah. The development of Anglican Church schools was inspired by foreign settlers to provide education to their children.

St. Michael's was founded in 1888 by the late Rev. William Henry Elton. At first, there were two students in the school, who taught Elton the Malay language and Mandarin. In exchange, Elton taught them English.

After World War II St. Michael's collapsed, but the school was rebuilt using donations from people around the district.

== Headteachers ==
#	Headteacher	Years of service
1	The Rev. William Henry Elton	1888–1893
2	H. J. Edney	1893–1894
3	George Mathew	1895
4	The Rev. William Henry Elton	1895–1901
5	Mr. Henry Elton	1901–1913
6	The Rev. William Henry Elton	1913–1914
7	The Rev. Robert Jack Hitchcock	1915–1918
8	L. E. Currey	No record
9	A. N. Ellis	No record
10	W. T. Keble	No record
11	D. S. Harrison	No record
12	The Rev. Stanley Milne Collier	1927-1928
13	B. J. Sole	No record
14	The Rev. James Paisley	1933-1934
15	The Rev. Herbert Cutler	1935-1938
16	The Rev. Reuben Henthorne	1938
17	The Rev. Peter Henry Herbert Howes	1938-1940
18	Fu Yun Fatt	1946–1947
19	The Rev. Jack Sparrow	1947–1948
20	The Rev. Norman Cecil Brown	1948–1949
21	Fong Chung Fui (acting)	1950–1951
22	Kenneth Douglas Franklin	1951–1956
23	John Brummell	1956–1964
24	Thien Thau Khiong	1965–1970
25	Vun Foh Foh	1970–1987
26	Tung Yow Choi	1988–1994
27	Ronnie Khoo	1994–1996
28	Dr. Edward Miku Tionsu	1996–1998
29	Henley Liew Yun Ye (1^{st} term)	1998–2003
30	Lee Poh Chin	2003–2005
31	Koh Kim Whatt	2006–2008
32	Leong Kwok Cheong	2009–2017
33	Henley Liew Yun Ye (2^{nd} term)	2017–2025
34	Felicia Michael Asang	2025–present

== Facilities and buildings ==
=== Layout ===
Located on the crest of Elton Hill, next to the World's Heritage, is St. Michael and All Angels' Church, the oldest stone structure in Sabah.

It has two academic buildings. Blok Warisan (Legacy Block) is a 2-storey wooden building with classrooms, the auditorium, the co-operative store, the surau and the multi-purpose court.

The other academic building, Blok Wawasan (Insight Block) is a 6-storey concrete building leaning on the crest of Elton Hill. It consists of five scientific laboratories, the staff office, the principal's office, the conference room, the K.D. Franklin Library, two canteen stalls, a skill training workshop, a kitchen workshop, an art centre, a dental clinic, a book storage room, a sports equipment storage room, an IT lab, and classrooms.

=== Other features ===
- The Botanical Garden was created by the "Environment Lovers' Club", and has since been demolished to secure the Legacy Block.
- The Heliconia Garden is a row of flowers planted by the "Environment Lovers' Club" as part of the Elton Hill's beautification project.
- Michaelean Court is the newest feature of the school for students recess time and hosts the new canteen.
- The Parish Hall is an activity hall lent by the church for school events such as the Graduation Ceremony.

== See also ==
- St. Michael's Secondary School (Penampang), Sabah, Malaysia (1890)
- St. Michael's Institution, Ipoh, Perak, Malaysia (1912)
- St. Michael's and all Angels Church, Sandakan, Sabah, Malaysia (1888)
