= Sandakan Jamek Mosque =

Mosque in Sandakan, Sabah, Malaysia

- Masjid Jamek Sandakan
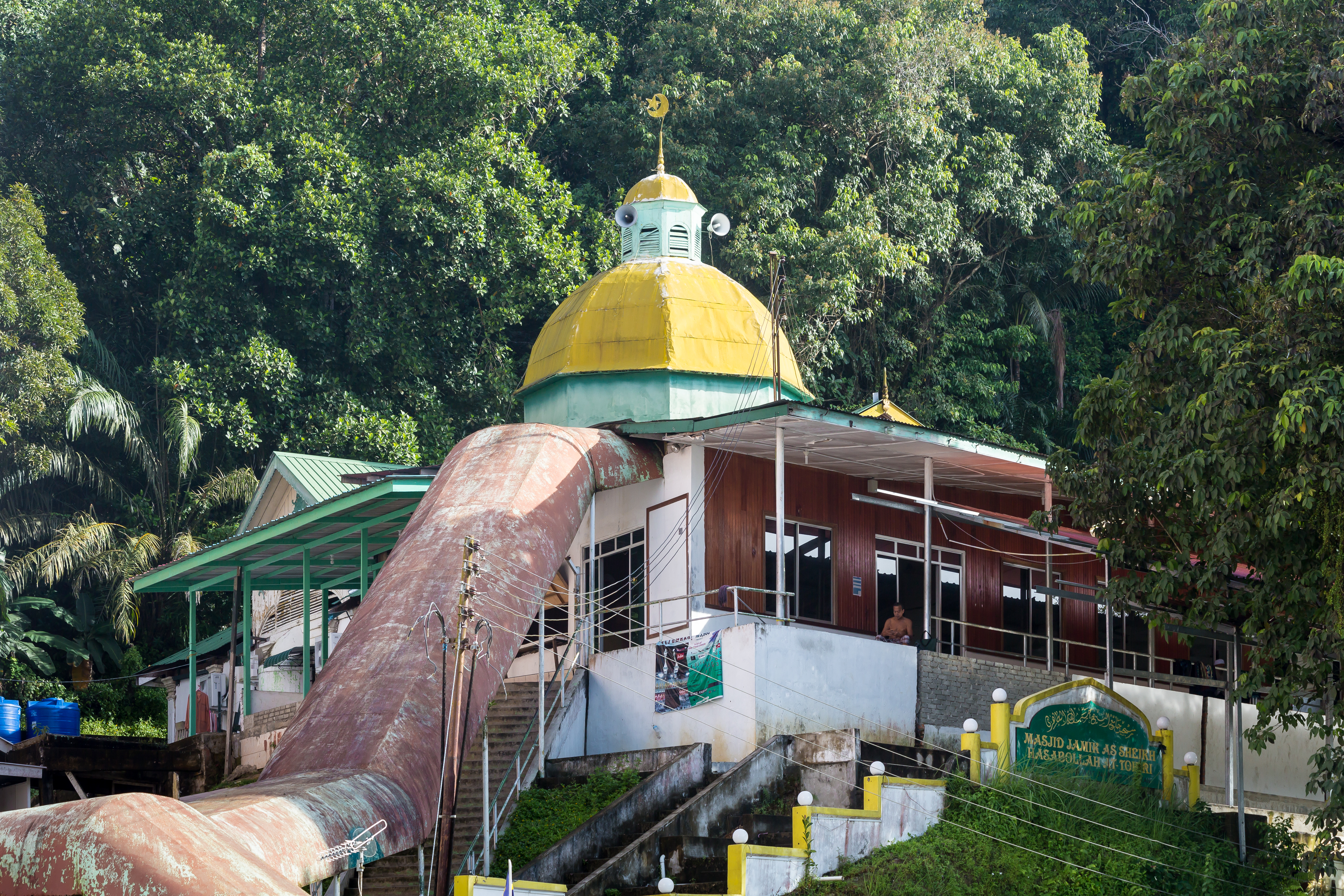

- Location within Sabah

Religion
- Affiliation: Islam
- Branch/tradition: Sunni

Location
- Location: Sandakan, Sabah, Malaysia
- Interactive map of Sandakan Jamek Mosque
- Coordinates: 5°50′28.69″N 118°7′5.87″E

Architecture
- Completed: 1890

The Sandakan Jamek Mosque (Malay: Masjid Jamek Sandakan or also known as Masjid Jamek Sheik Hasabollah At-Tohiri) is a mosque in Sandakan, Sabah, Malaysia. Opened in 1890, it is the oldest mosque in Sandakan, part of Sandakan Heritage Trail.

== History ==
The mosque was opened in 1890 by Damsah, a Muslim cloth merchant from British Raj (present-day India). During World War II, the mosque become a hiding places for the town Muslim populations from the Japanese. The Japanese military believes the mosque could also become the hiding place for British soldiers that leading them to shot the mosque several times during the war.

== See also ==
- Islam in Malaysia
