= Sam Sing Kung Temple =

Chinese temple in Malaysia

- Malay: Tokong Sam Sing Kung; Chinese: 三聖宮
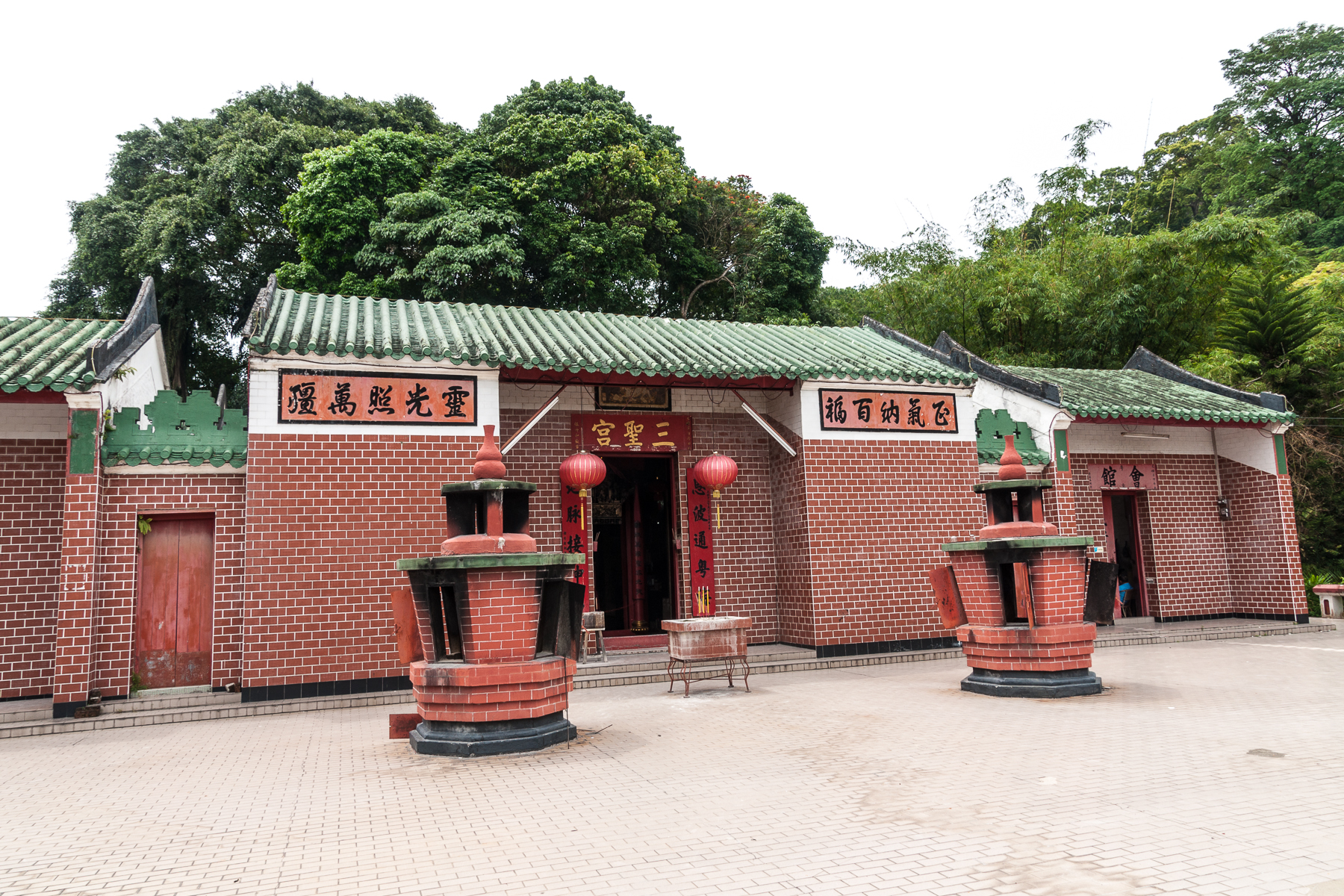
- Sam Sing Kung Temple

Religion
- Affiliation: Taoism
- District: Sandakan District

Location
- Location: Sandakan
- State: Sabah
- Country: Malaysia
- Interactive map of Sam Sing Kung Temple
- Coordinates: 5°50′26.88″N 118°6′51.48″E

Architecture
- Type: Chinese temple
- Established: unknown
- Completed: 1887

Sam Sing Kung Temple (Chinese: 三聖宮) (also known as the Three Saints Temple) is a Chinese temple in Sandakan, Sabah, Malaysia. Built in 1887, the temple is the third oldest temple in Sandakan, after Goddess of Mercy Temple and Tam Kung Temple. It is part of the Sandakan Heritage Trail.

== History ==
The temple was built in 1887, and has undergone several recent renovations. The temple was originally established as a religious centre for Chinese migrants who had arrived from Guangdong, Qing Dynasty. It was built by Chinese communities of Cantonese, Teochew, Hakkas and the Hainanese people. The temple are also called as "Three Saints Temple" with the three saints refers to:

- Kwan Woon Cheung – Saint of righteousness.
- Goddess of Tin Hou – Worshipped by fishermen and seamen for protection.
- Min Cheong Emperor – Worshipped by hopeful students who seek success in examinations.

The temple is known as a place for Chinese devotees to come for blessing and divination.

== Features ==
The temple houses a collection of 100 pre-printed Taoist Divination Poems. Its bronze bell was a donation from Fung Ming Shan, the first Kapitan Cina of Sandakan. Appointed by the British authorities in 1887, Ming Shan was responsible for managing and overseeing the Chinese community in the town.
