= Sandakan Heritage Trail =

Sight-seeing pathway in Sabah, Malaysia

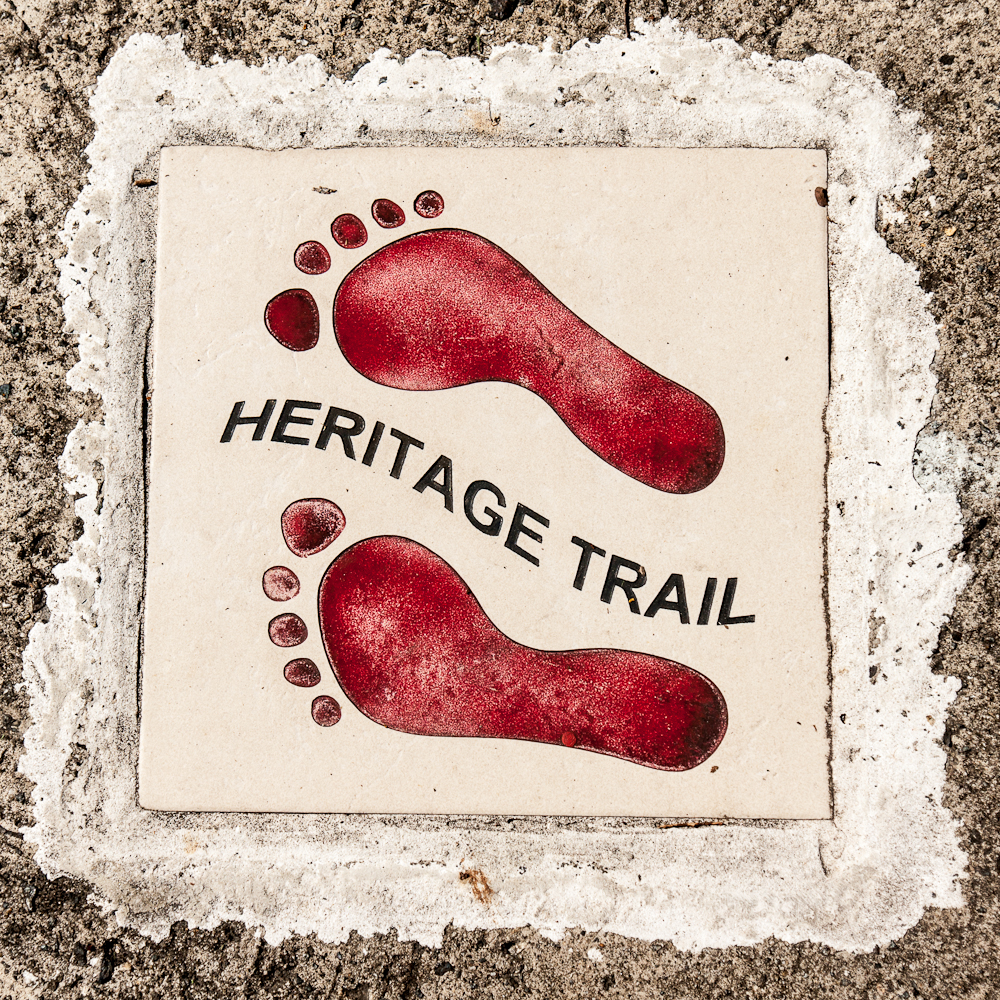
Marking of the Heritage Trail in the terrain.

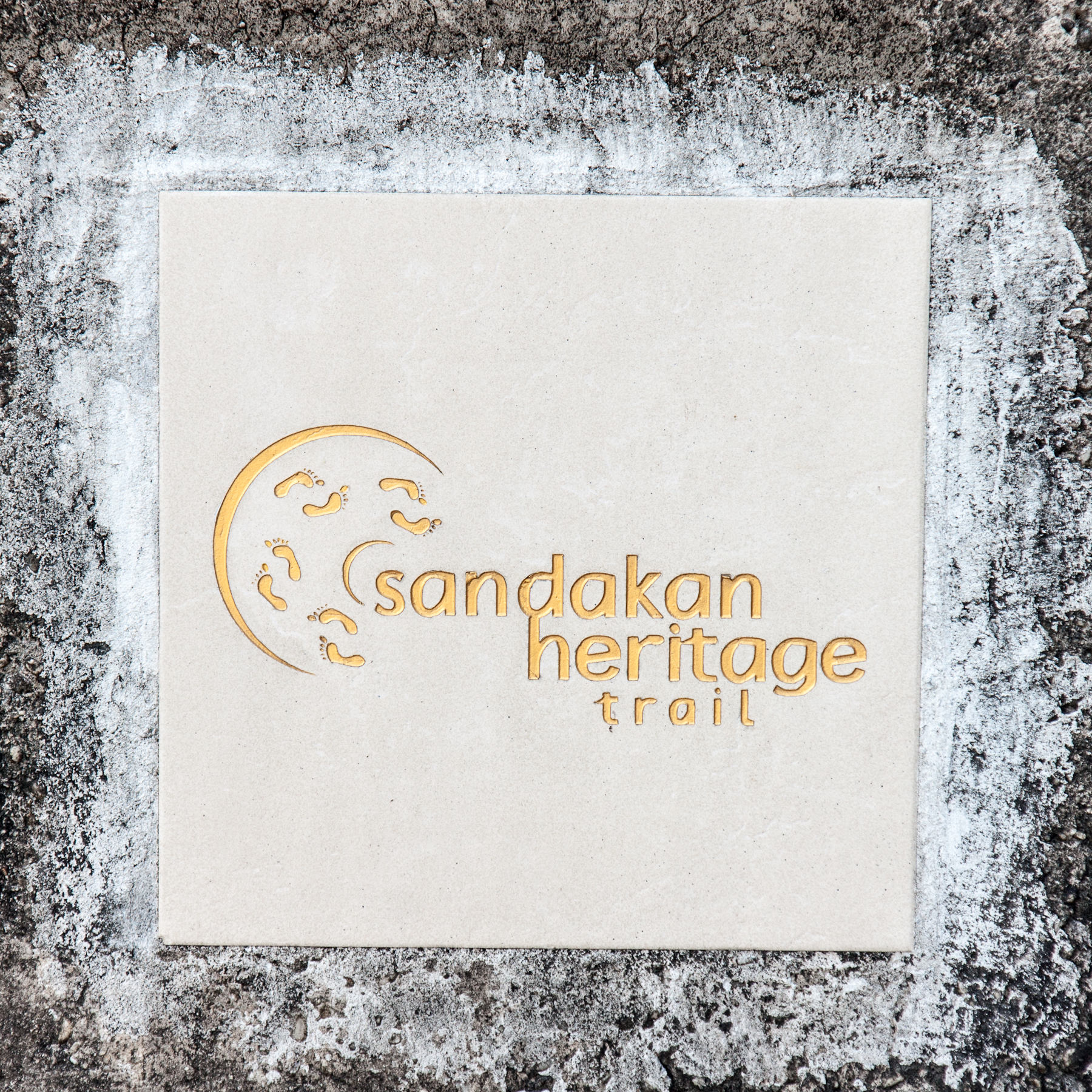
Newer version of the mark.

The Sandakan Heritage Trail (Malay: Jejak Warisan Sandakan) is a trail connecting several historical sites in Sandakan, a town in the east Malaysian state of Sabah. It is marked with white concrete tiles placed on the ground, showing a red footprint as well as the words "Heritage Trail" in either black or gold.

== History ==
Sandakan was almost completely destroyed during Second World War. The few remaining historical relics of the former North Borneo capital was combined into a historical trail in 2003 as Sandakan Heritage Trail (SHT).

== Landmarks ==
At present, the eleven stations of the Heritage Trail are as follows:

- Sandakan Jamek Mosque
- MPS Square with the William Pryer Monument, the Chartered Company Monument, the Sandakan War Monument and the Sandakan Liberation Monument
- 100-step staircase
- Agnes Keith House
- Historic staircase
- Goddess of Mercy Temple
- St. Michael's and All Angels Church
- Sam Sing Kung Temple
- Malaysia fountain
- Tourist Information Centre and Sandakan Heritage Museum
