= St. Michael's and All Angels Church, Sandakan =

St. Michael's and All Angels Church
- Parish of St. Michael's and All Angels
- Malay: Gereja St. Michael dan Seluruh Malaikat
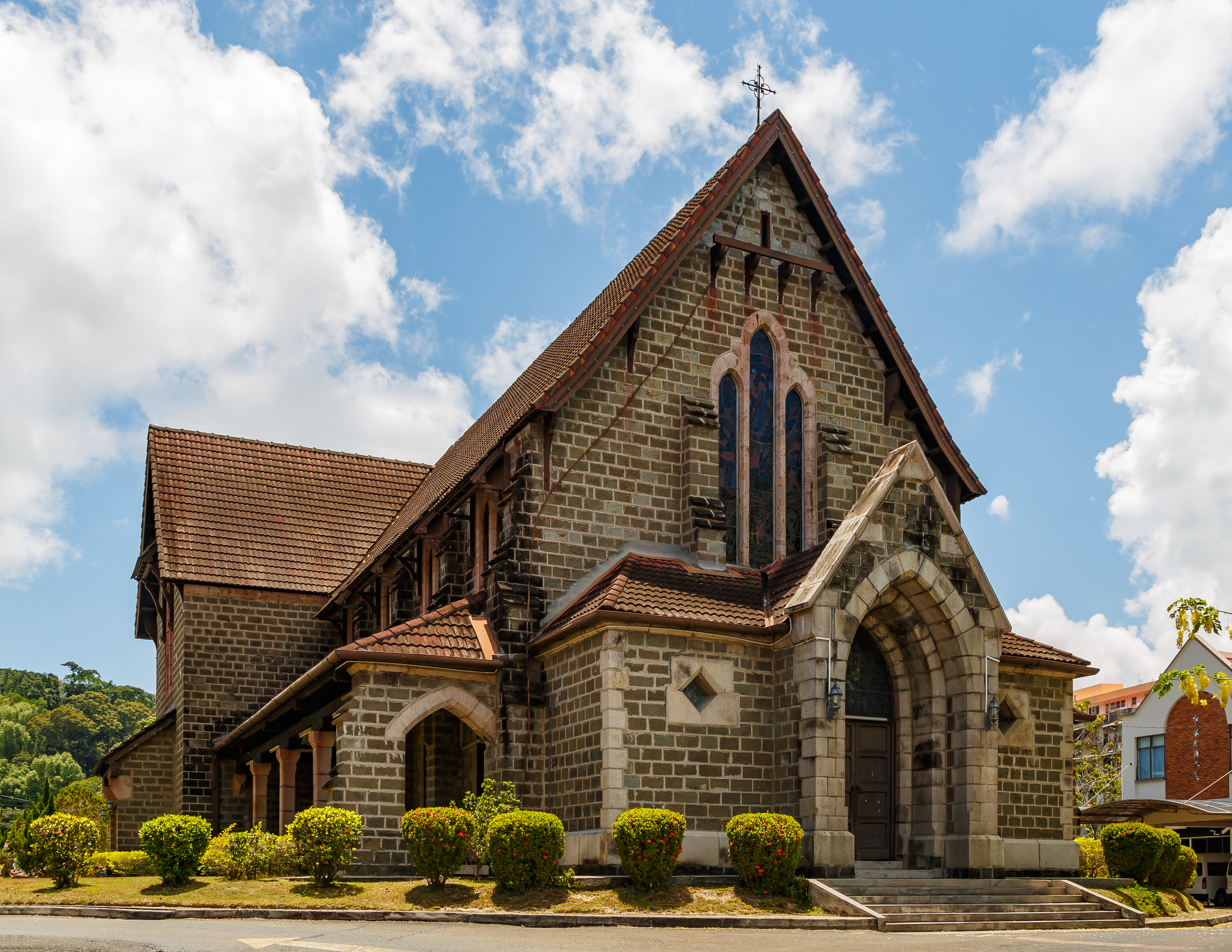
- St. Michael's and All Angels Church
- 5°50′26.18″N 118°6′46.5″E
- Location: 90000 Sandakan, Sabah, Malaysia
- Denomination: Anglican

Architecture
- Completed: 1925

Administration
- Diocese: Sabah
- Archdeaconry: East Coast Archdeaconry

Clergy
- Priest: Archdeacon Lidis Singkung

The Parish of St. Michael's and All Angels or for short St. Michael's Church is an Anglican church in the city of Sandakan in the Malaysian state of Sabah in northern Borneo. St. Michael is the oldest stone church in Sabah. The impetus for the construction of the church dates back to the clergyman William Henry Elton, who is also known as the founder of St. Michael's Secondary School, located next to the church.

The church is also part of the Sandakan Heritage Trails, a Heritage Trail which connects the historic sights and monuments of Sandakan.

== History ==
The North Borneo Chartered Company controlled North Borneo in 1881. The mostly British employees of the company desired for an Anglican church to be established. Initially, laymen were used to conduct religious ceremonies in a detached room in the Colonial Secretary's House and, if present, would take over the service from the highest-ranking government officials, Governor William Hood Treacher. William Burgess Pryer, founder of Sandakan and an active layman himself, already wrote in January 1883 a pleading letter to the head of the Anglican Communion, the Archbishop of Canterbury. During mid-1888, a news reached Sandakan that Reverend William Henry Elton was appointed as a priest for Sandakan.

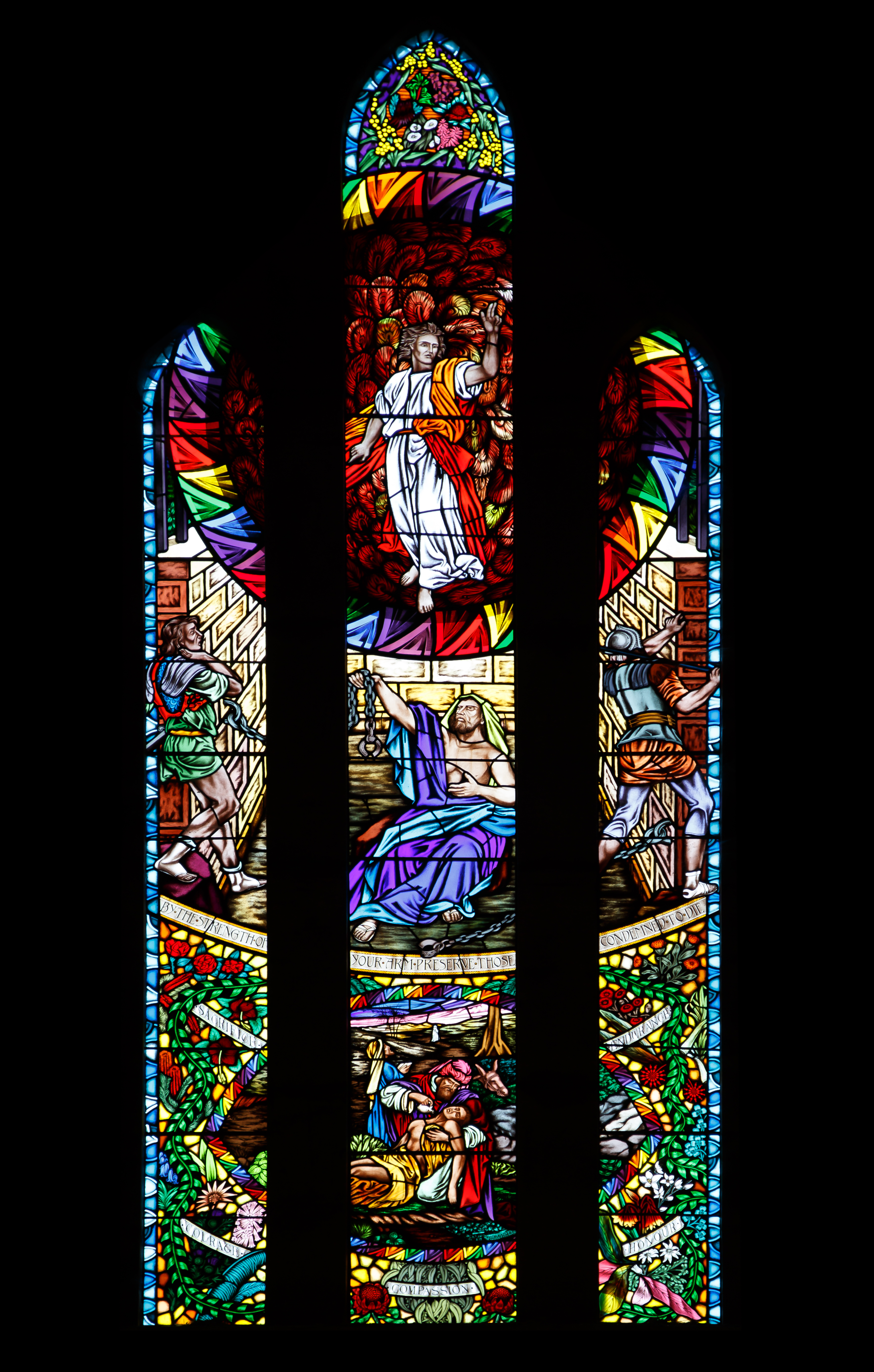
The west stained glass window.

Elton arrived in Sandakan on 2 September 1888. Governor Charles Vandeleur Creagh asked the religious authority to select a vacant piece of land for the construction of a mission station. Assisted by Von Donop, Elton explored in the following weeks around the forest and finally found a two-acre property, in which the construction of a temporary church with the associated vicariate, schools for boys and girls and the necessary outbuildings seemed suitable. His plan was unanimously adopted on 5 October 1888.

The church building is also the first completely built stone building in Sabah. The foundation stone was laid on 29 September 1893 by Governor Creagh and it took more than 30 years to complete.

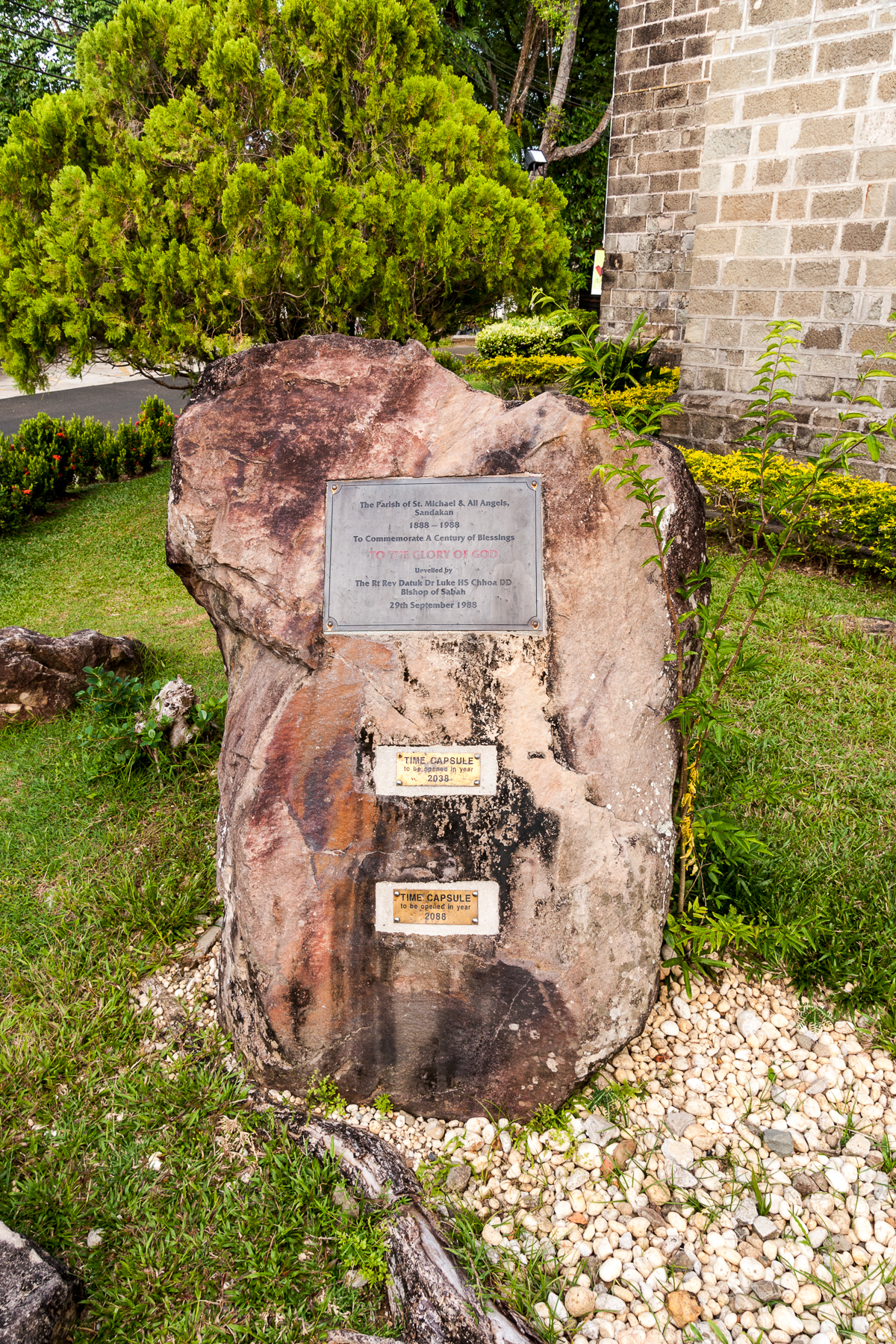
Memorial stone for the 100th anniversary of the parish. In the bottom half, there are two time capsules.

When the plans of the New Zealand architect BW Mountfort were unveiled, Elton was hugely involved in choosing the materials. The use of Eusideroxylon zwageri (Bornean belian wood) would dramatically increase the cost of construction, while the usage of bricks was not considered to be cosmetically pleasing, so they finally agreed on a building made of stone blocks, specifically granite. While the white stones that adorn the windows and doors were imported from Hong Kong, the darker stones came from a quarry near Kampong Buli Sim Sim, where they were carved by prisoners at a cost of about 1.50 Straits dollar per cubic meter. One of the stone blocks is 30 cm in length and weighed about 63 kilograms.

The sanctification of the main nave was made on 30 September 1906 during Michaelmas. The western portal, which is the main entrance to the church, was not completed at that time and was consecrated only in 1925, 32 years after construction began. In May 1941 Rev Reuben Henthorne and Rev Denis W.A. Brown were interned by the Japanese. Services continued at the church until 1943 when it was closed and used as a store. The church was dynamited by the Japanese forces before surrender in 1945 as World War II ended, although the shell of the church remained standing. Reconstruction began soon after the war, and St Michael's is still one of the few historic stone buildings in Sabah. The coloured stained glass windows were donated to commemorate the 60th anniversary of the end of the World War II by Australians.

== Memorial Stone ==
At the northwest corner of the church is a memorial stone erected in 1988, commemorating the 100th anniversary of the parish. On the stone, a metal plate is fitted with the inscription:

The Parish of St. Michael & All Angels,

Sandakan
1888–1988
To Commemorate A Century Of Blessings
TO THE GLORY OF GOD
Unveiled by
The Rt Rev Datuk Dr Luke HS Chhoa DD
Bishop of Sabah
29th September 1988

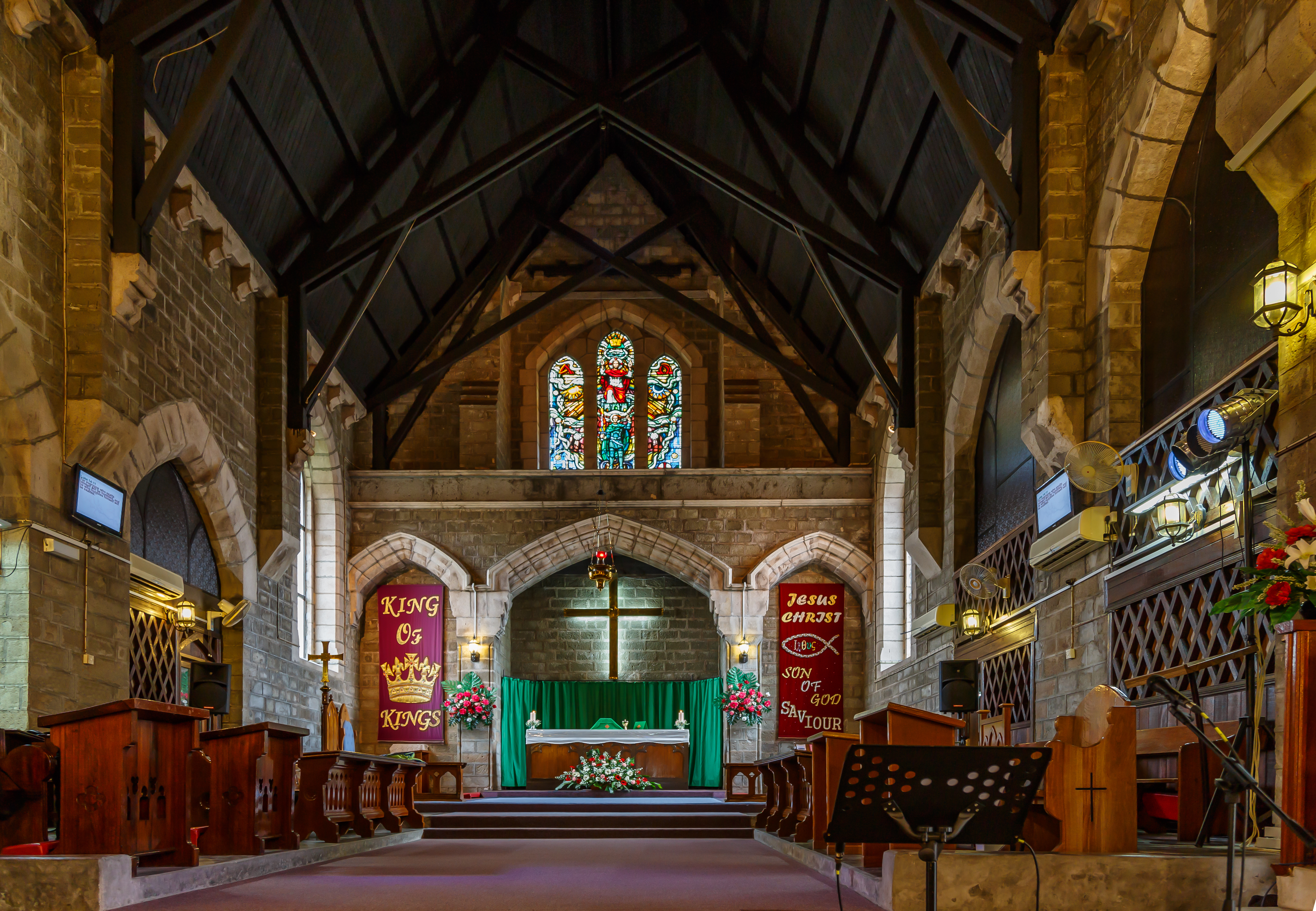
The interior of the church.

Below the plaque are two time capsules that are to be opened in 2038 and 2088.

== Pastors and priests of St. Michael ==
Since the founding of the parish in 1888, the following persons acted as pastors and priests of St. Michael:

William Henry Elton	1888–1912
Henry J. Edney	1897–1901
Thomas C. Alexander	1913–1926
Robert J. Hichock	1914–1918
Bernard AM. Mercer	1926–1939
Stanley M. Collier	1928–1929
Sung Khi Fong	1930–1933
James Paisley	1933–1935
Herbert Cutler	1934–1938
Reuben Henthorne	1936–1945
Sung Khi Fung	1939–1946
Denis A W. Brown	1938–1945
Arthur J. Sparrow	1947–1948
Noeman C. Bowron	1948–1949
Frank Lomax	1950–1962
Vun Nen Vun	1954–1956
James Hui To Kan	1958–1960
Arthur J. Stally	1962–1965
Kenneth Franklin	1966–1967
Malcolm A. Hughes	1967–1970
Shim Hon Sam	1967–1968
Luke Ooi	1970–1973
Rinson T. K. Lin	1970–1972
Yong Ping Chung	1973–1985
Koo Tuk Su	1986–1994
Lawrence Victor Green	1994
Koo Tuk Su	1995–1996
Dr. Wilfred Chee See Hing	1997–January 1999
Moses Chin Su Hyun	April 1999–2006
Clarence Fu	2006–January 2011
Chak Sen Fen	January 2011–2013
Yong Thiam Choy	2013

== Missionary, Outreach & Ministry ==
- St. Michael's Secondary School
- St. Monica's Primary School
- Vision Primary & Secondary School
- Indah Anglican Church
- St. Gabriel's Chapel
- 1st Sandakan Boys' Brigade
- 4th Sandakan Girls' Brigade
- Seguntor Alternative Learning Centre (SALC)
- Seguntor Welfare School
- Anglican Mawar Care Centre
- Elton Cafe

== Literature ==
- Reverend Brian Taylor: THE ELTON HILL ‘DIARY’ — The story of the founding of St. Michael’s Church (PDF; 3,1 MB) Lai Hing & Company, 1976
- 75 Years on Elton Hill, The History of St. Michael’s Church Sandakan, North Borneo, hrsg. vom Church Council of St. Michael’s, Sandakan, 1963; Festschrift

== See also ==
- Anglicanism
- Anglican Communion
- Christianity in Malaysia
- Church of the Province of South East Asia
- Diocese of Sabah
