= Sandakan Municipal Council =

Local authority in Malaysia

- Majlis Perbandaran Sandakan

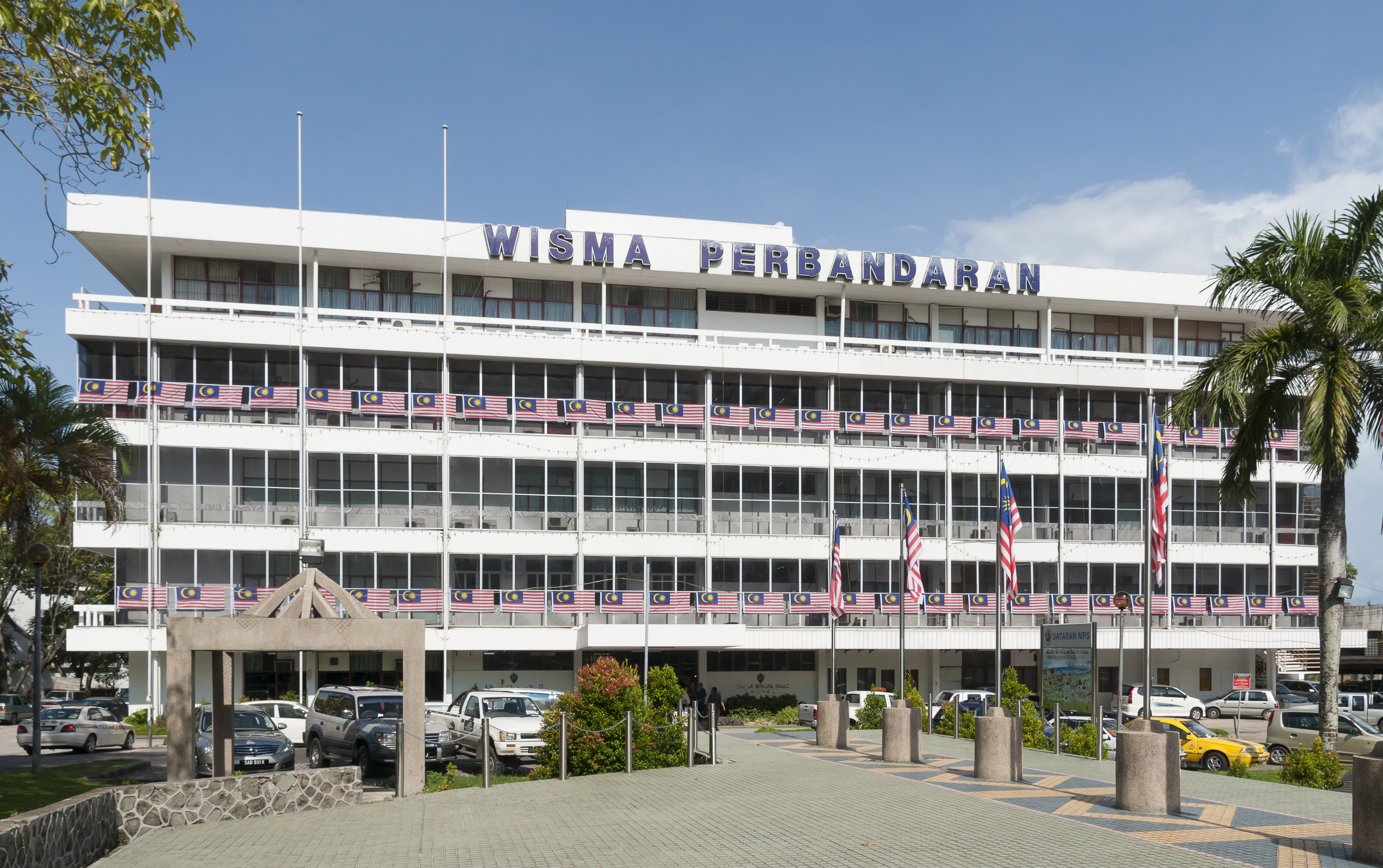

Agency overview
- Formed: 1 January 1982; 44 years ago
- Jurisdiction: City of Sandakan
- Headquarters: PO Box 221, 90702 Sandakan, Sabah, Malaysia; 5°50′24″N 118°7′0″E
- Motto: MPS Memudah Cara, Sandakan Terus Maju
- Agency executive: Datuk Walter Kenson, President
- Website: mps.sabah.gov.my/portal/

Sandakan Municipal Council (Malay: Majlis Perbandaran Sandakan, abbreviated MPS) is the municipal council which administrates the city and municipalities area of Sandakan in the state of Sabah, Malaysia.

== History ==
The municipal council is formed in 1982 following the merger between Sandakan Town Board and Rural District Council on 1 January 1982. The title of "Commissioner" was subsequently replaced with "President" while "Employee" becomes "Secretary". On 1 January 1984, Sandakan District Office was abolished by the state government with some of their previous duties and responsibilities were taken over by the municipal council and the former district officer became deputy president of the council. In April 2018, Sabah Minister of Local Government and State Housing Hajiji Noor said that the Cabinet of Sabah has decided to upgrade the status of the municipal council into Sandakan City Council with the plans supposed to take effect on 1 July. However, following the sudden change of government in the 2018 election, the plans unable to become reality. On 4 September 2018, the President of the council was replaced by a new president with focus are given on other matters. Through the statement by Sabah Deputy Chief Minister and Local Government and Housing Minister Jaujan Sambakong on 5 August 2019, the new government will continue the plan to elevating Sandakan's status as the second city in Sabah. In 2021, the 9th Prime Minister Ismail Sabri Yaakob has pre-launch Sandakan as the second city in Sabah. The Public Works Minister Bung Moktar Radin said that if everything went smoothly they had planned Sandakan to achieve city status by October 2022.

== President of Sandakan Municipal Council (Presiden) ==
Since 1982, the town has been led by fourteenth presidents. The previous presidents are listed as below:

No	President	Term start	Term end
1	Mohd Tahir Jaafar	1982	1983
2	Abdul Ghani Rashid	1984	1986
3	Kamaruddin Linggam	1986	1988
4	Ignatius J. Bantoi	1988	1995
5	Leong Chen Kong	1995	1996
6	Claudius Roman	1996	2000
7	Adeline Leong	2000	2004
8	Yeo Boon Hai	2004	2009
9	Ir. James Wong	2009	2018
10	Hii Chang Lik	2018	2019
11	Wong Foo Tin	2019	2021
12	Benedict Asmat	2021	2023
13	Henry Idol	2023	2025
14	Walter Kenson	2025	Incumbent
