= List of peninsulas =

A peninsula (Latin: paeninsula from paene "almost" and insula "island") is a piece of land that is bordered mostly by water but connected to mainland. The surrounding water is usually understood to be continuous, though not necessarily named as such. A peninsula can also be a headland, cape, island promontory, bill, point, or spit. A point is generally considered a tapering piece of land projecting into a body of water that is less prominent than a cape. In English, the plural of peninsula is peninsulas or, less commonly, peninsulae. A river which courses through a very tight meander is also sometimes said to form a "peninsula" within the (almost closed) loop of water.

Presented below is a list of peninsulas.

== Africa ==
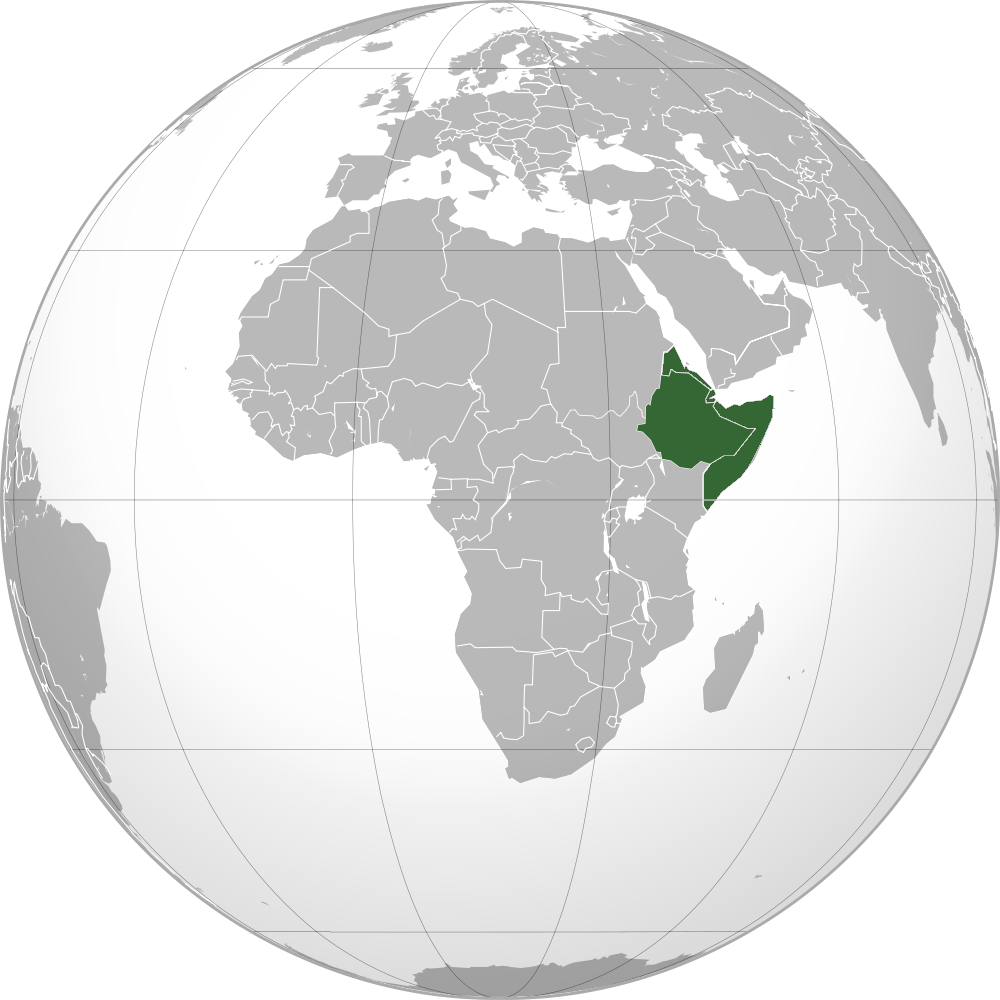
The Horn of Africa also known as the Somali Peninsula

=== Macaronesia ===
- Jandía, Fuerteventura, Canary Islands, Spain
- Macizo de Anaga, Tenerife, Canary Islands, Spain
- Ponta de São Lourenço, Madeira Island, Portugal

=== North Africa ===
- Cabo Blanco, Mauritania/Morocco
- Cap Bon, Tunisia
- Cap Zebib, Tunisia
- Ceuta, Spain
- Río de Oro Peninsula, Morocco
- Ras Banas, Egypt
- Ras ben Sakka, Tunisia

=== Somali Peninsula ===
The Horn of Africa is a peninsula in Northeast Africa that juts into the Guardafui Channel, and is the easternmost projection of the African continent. It denotes the region containing the countries of Djibouti, Eritrea, Ethiopia, and Somalia.

- Buri Peninsula, Eritrea
- Ras Hafun, Somalia
- Ras Kasar, Eritrea
- Ras Siyyan, Djibouti

=== West Africa ===
- Lekki Peninsula, Lagos, Nigeria
- Cap-Vert, Senegal
- Turner's Peninsula, Sierra Leone

=== Other peninsulas in Africa ===
- Bakassi, Cameroon, but disputed with Nigeria
- Cape Peninsula, South Africa
- Le Morne Brabant, Mauritius
- Uyoma, Kenya

== Antarctica ==
- Antarctic Peninsula
- Edward VII Peninsula
- Fletcher Peninsula
- Fowler Peninsula
- Martin Peninsula

== Asia ==
=== Eastern Asia ===
==== China ====
- Liaodong Peninsula
- Shandong Peninsula
- Dapeng Peninsula
- Leizhou Peninsula
- Macau Peninsula

==== Hong Kong ====
Hong Kong itself is a peninsula.

==== Japan ====
===== Hokkaido =====
- Shiretoko Peninsula
- Shakotan Peninsula

===== Honshū =====
- Oshika-hanto
- Noto-hanto
- Oga-hanto
- Miura-hanto
- Bōsō-hanto

===== Kyūshū =====
- Nishi-sonogi-hanto
- Satsuma-hanto
- Ōsumi-hanto
- Shimabara-hanto

==== Korea ====
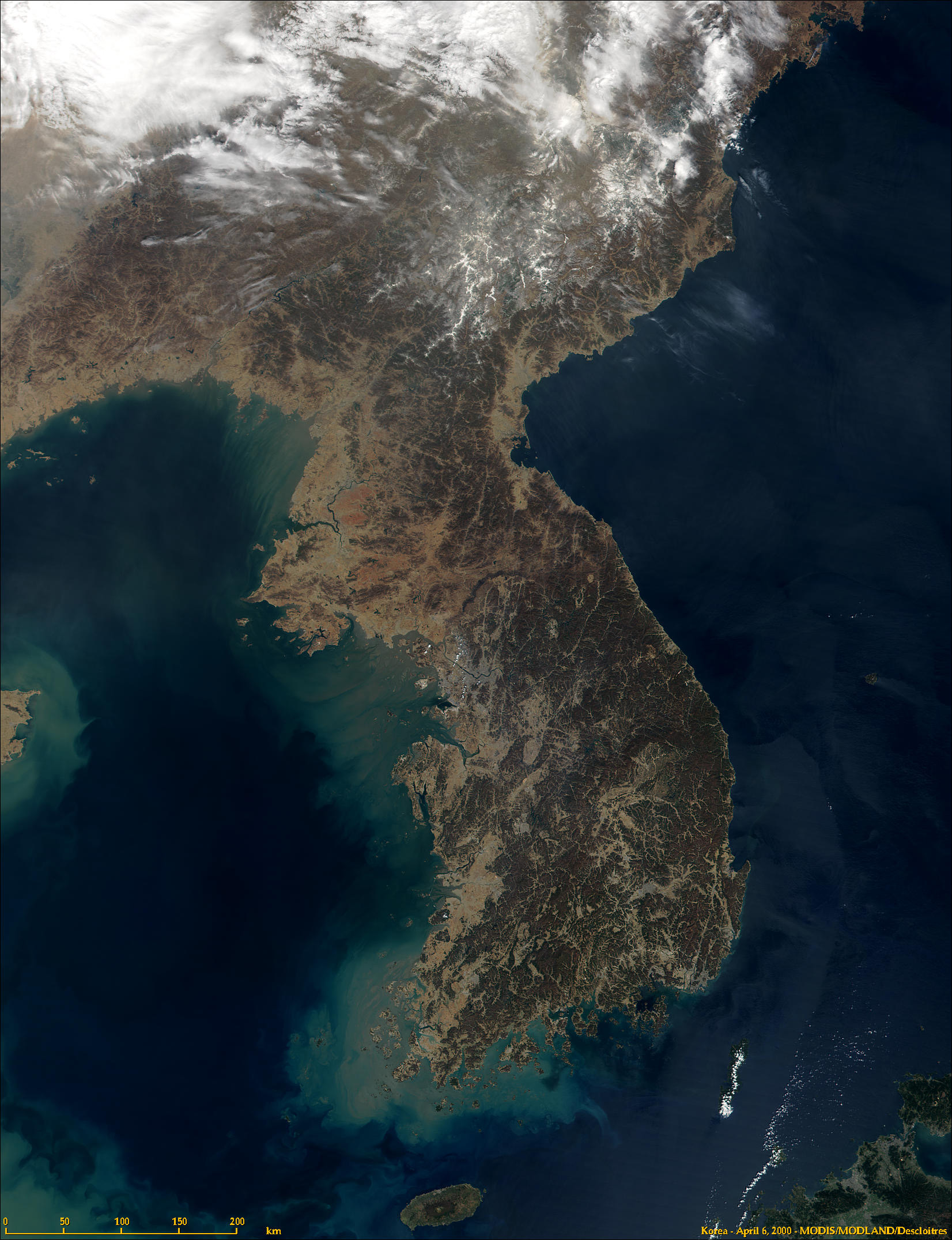
Korean Peninsula

The whole landmass encompassing North and South Korea is a peninsula, surrounded by the East Sea to the east and south, and the Yellow Sea to the west and south, with the Korea Strait connecting them.

=== Northern Asia ===
- Chukchi Peninsula
- Faddeyevsky Peninsula
- Gyda Peninsula
- Kamchatka Peninsula
- Mikhailov Peninsula
- Muravyov-Amursky Peninsula
- Taymyr Peninsula
- Yamal Peninsula

=== Southeastern Asia ===
==== Vietnam ====
- Camau Peninsula

==== Myanmar ====
- Irawaddy Peninsula

==== Thailand ====
- Tapaya/Rachon Peninsula Chonburi-Rayong Province
- Sathing Phra Peninsula

==== Cambodia ====
- Sihanouk Peninsula
- Botum Peninsula

==== Indonesia ====
- Blambangan Peninsula, Java
- Minahasa Peninsula, Sulawesi
- East Peninsula, Sulawesi
- South-east Peninsula, Sulawesi
- South Peninsula, Sulawesi
- Bird's Head Peninsula, West Papua Province
- Cape Mangkalihat, East Kalimantan

==== Malaysia ====
- Northwestern Peninsula, Kudat
- Pitas Peninsula, Pitas
- Semporna Peninsula, Semporna and Tawau
- Sandakan Peninsula, Sandakan
- Peninsula Malaysia

==== Philippines ====
- Bataan Peninsula, Luzon
- Bicol Peninsula, Luzon
- Caramoan Peninsula, Bicol
- Bondoc Peninsula, Luzon
- Calatagan Peninsula, Luzon
- Calumpan Peninsula, Luzon
- Cavite City, Luzon
- Manila Peninsula, Luzon
- San Ildefonso Peninsula, Luzon
- Redondo Peninsula, Luzon
- Zamboanga Peninsula, Mindanao
- Tinaca Point, Davao del Sur
- Guanguan Peninsula, Mindanao
- Northwest Panay Peninsula, Visayas
- Poro Point, La Union

==== Singapore ====
- Tuas

=== South Asia ===
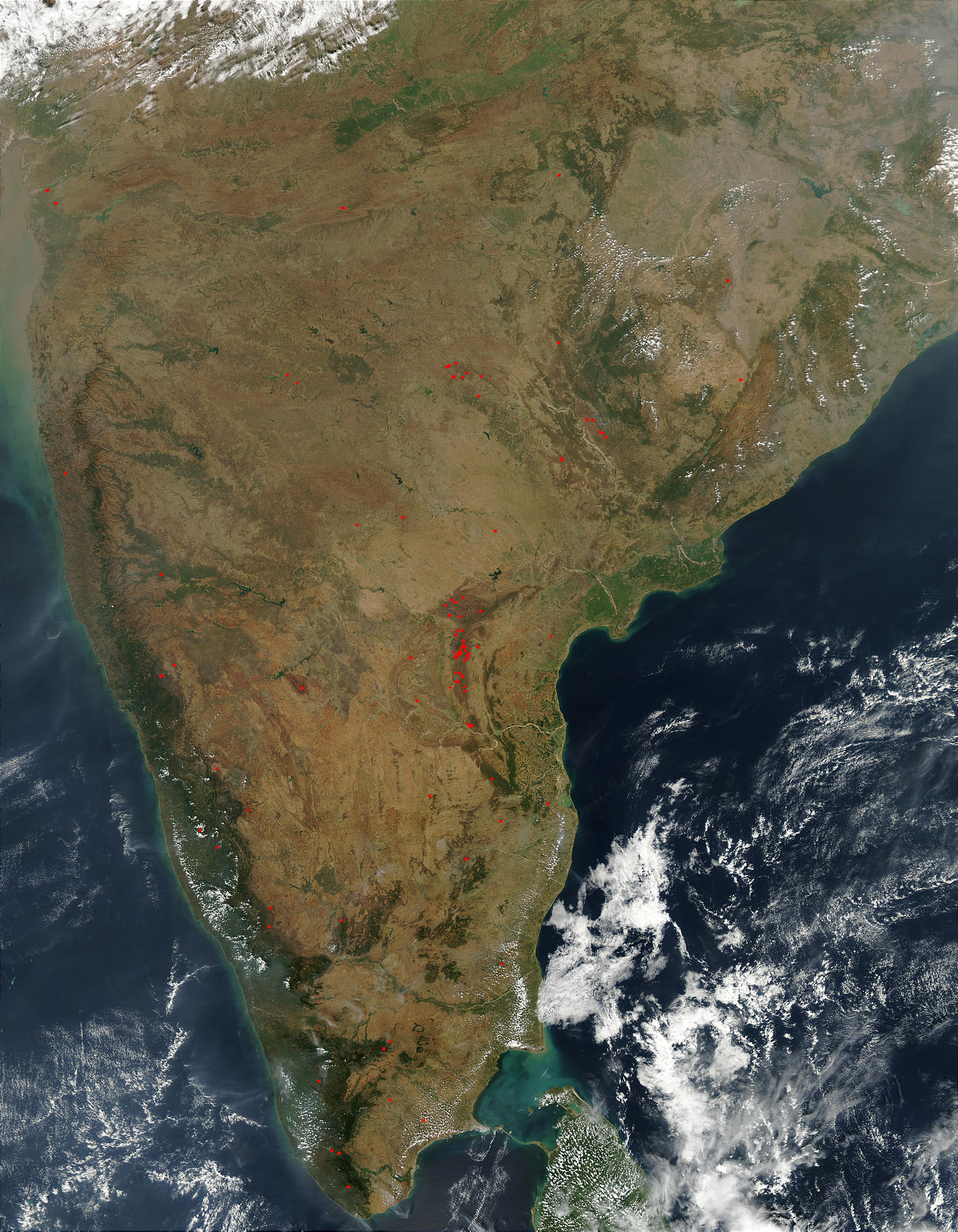
South India (Peninsular India)

The Deccan Peninsula is the largest geographical feature of the Indian subcontinent.

=== Southwest Asia ===
==== Arabia ====
- Arabian Peninsula; Arabian is the largest peninsula in this region.

=== West Asia ===
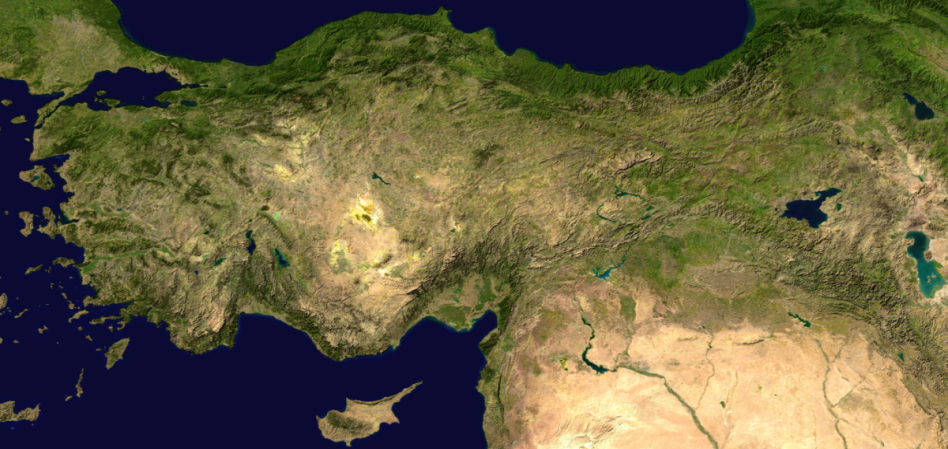
Map of the Anatolian Peninsula, the Asian part of Turkey

- Anatolian Peninsula Anatolia is the largest peninsula in this region.

== Europe ==
Europe is sometimes considered to be a large peninsula extending off Eurasia. As such, it is one of the largest peninsulas in the world and the only one to have the status as a full continent, largely as a matter of convention rather than science. It is composed of many smaller peninsulas, the four main and largest component peninsulas being the Scandinavian, Iberian, Balkan, and Apennine peninsulas.

=== Balkan Peninsula ===
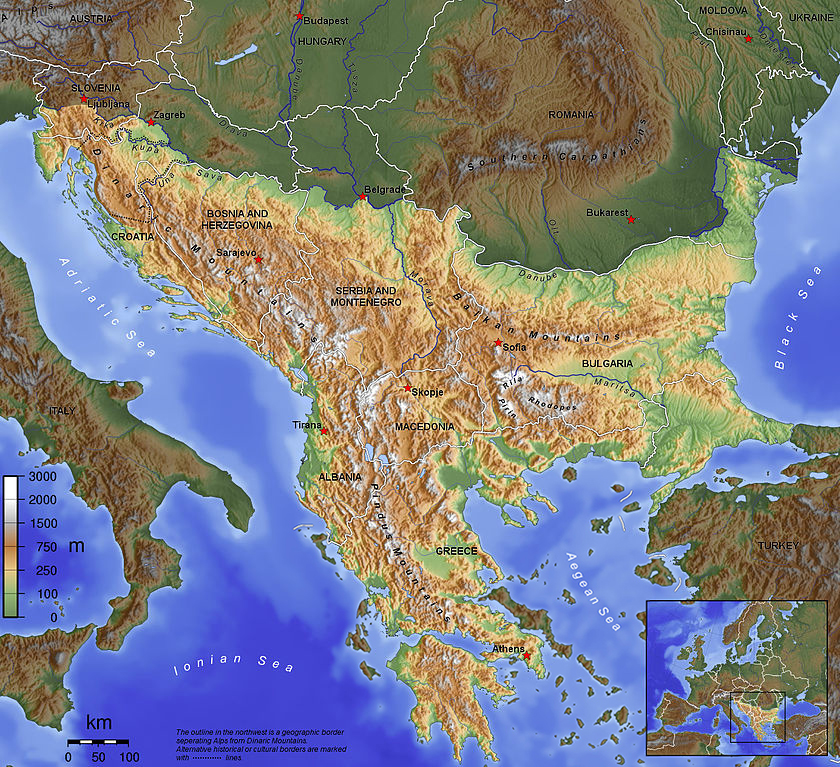
The assumed Balkan Peninsula, as defined by the Soča–Vipava–Krka–Sava–Danube border.

The Balkans is a region which natural borders do not coincide with the technical definition of a peninsula hence modern geographers reject the idea of a Balkan Peninsula. It would include Albania, Bosnia and Herzegovina, Bulgaria, Croatia, Greece, Kosovo, North Macedonia, Montenegro, Romania, Serbia, Slovenia and the European part of Turkey.

- Chalkidiki, Greece
- Kassandra, Greece
- Mani Peninsula, Greece
- Mount Athos, Greece
- Peloponnese, Greece (now an island because of the Corinth Canal)
- Sithonia, Greece
- Pilio, Greece
- Istria, Croatia
- Piran Peninsula, Slovenia
- Pelješac, Croatia
- Prevlaka, Croatia
- Split, Croatia
- Zadar, Croatia
- Karaburun Peninsula, Albania
- Luštica, Montenegro
- Gallipoli, Turkey
- Klek (peninsula), Bosnia and Herzegovina
- Istanbul, Turkey

=== France ===
- Brittany
- Cap Corse, Corsica
- Cotentin Peninsula, Normandy
- Crozon, Finistère
- Landes du Médoc, Aquitaine

=== Iberian Peninsula ===
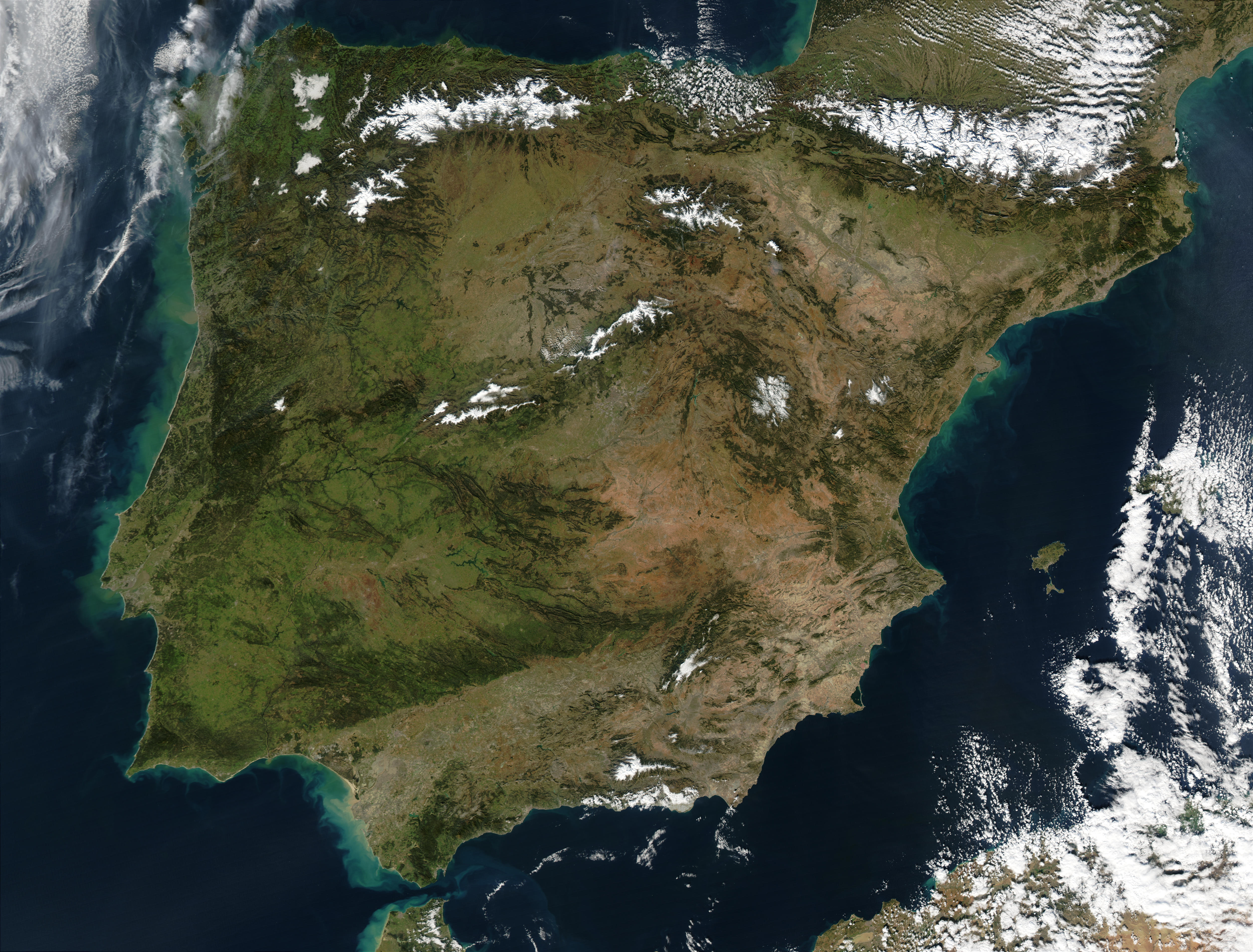
Satellite view of the Iberian Peninsula

Encompassing continental Portugal and Spain, Andorra, Gibraltar (British Overseas Territory), and a small amount of Southern France, the Iberian Peninsula is a dominant geographical feature of Iberia.

Other peninsulas in Iberia include:

- Lisbon Peninsula, Portugal
- Setúbal Peninsula, Portugal
- Peniche, Portugal
- Cabo Espichel, Portugal
- Cabo Carvoeiro, Portugal
- Cabo de São Vicente, Portugal
- Tróia Peninsula, Portugal
- Gibraltar, United Kingdom
- Cádiz, Andalusia, Spain
- A Coruña, Galicia, Spain
- O Morrazo, Pontevedra, Galicia, Spain

=== Ireland ===
- Achill Head Peninsula
- Beara Peninsula
- Cooley Peninsula
- Dingle Peninsula
- Donegal
- Fanad Peninsula
- Hook Peninsula
- Horn Head
- Howth Peninsula
- Inishowen
- Iveragh Peninsula
- Loop Head Peninsula
- Mizen Head Peninsula
- Mullet Peninsula
- Munster
- Old Head of Kinsale
- Rosguill
- Sheep's Head Peninsula

=== Italy ===
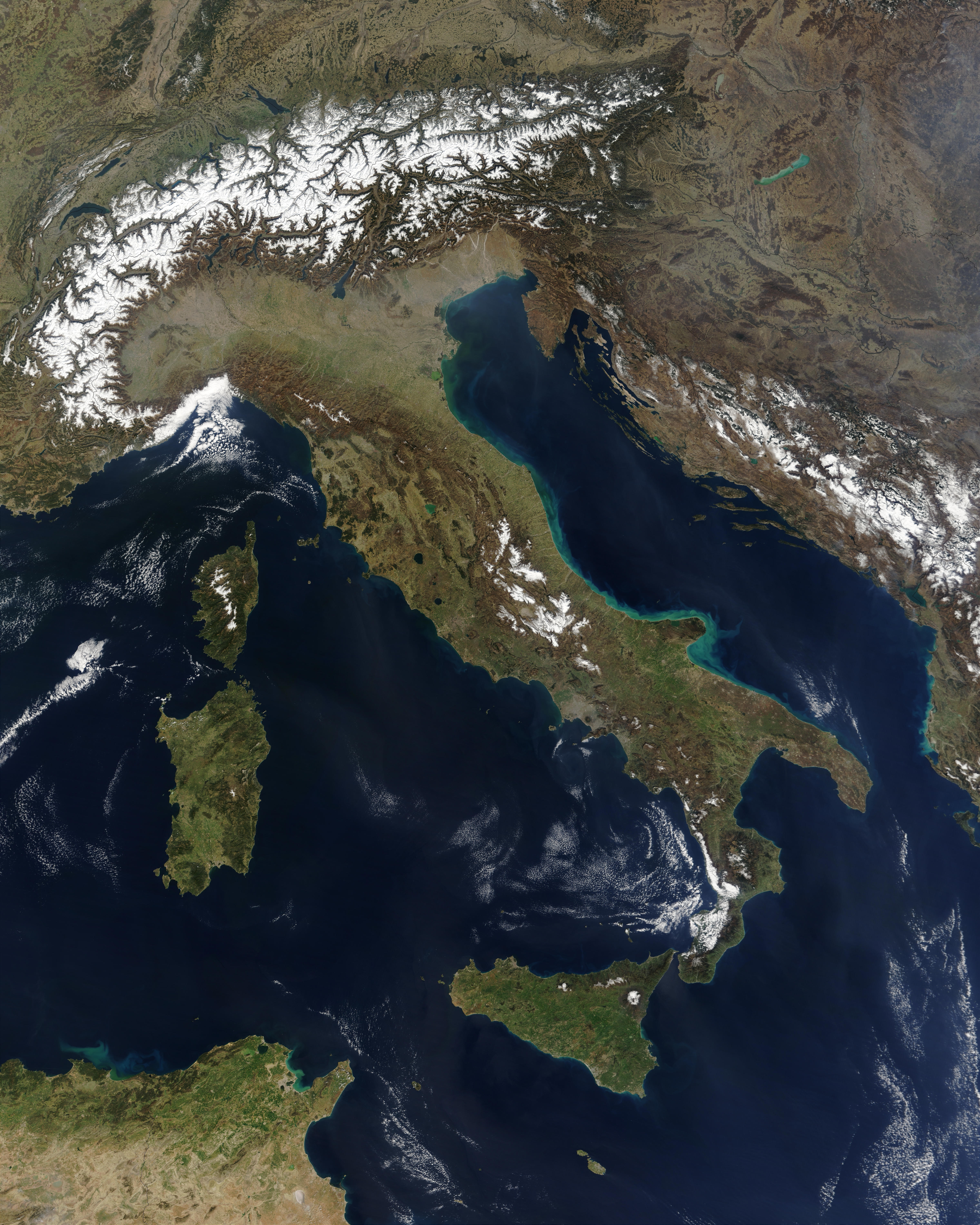
Satellite view of the Apennine Peninsula

The Apennine Peninsula is the dominant geographical feature of Italy.

Other peninsulas in Italy include:

Adriatic Sea

- Promontorio del Gargano

Ionian Sea

- Calabria
- Salento

Ligurian Sea

- Portofino
- Portovenere
- Promontorio di Piombino

Tyrrhenian Sea

- Gaeta
- Promontorio del Circeo
- Promontorio dell'Argentario
- Promontorio di Punta Ala
- Sorrentine Peninsula

=== Malta ===
- Valletta
- Senglea
- Birgu
- Sliema
- Ta' Xbiex
- Marsaskala
- Fort Ricasoli

=== Russia ===
- Curonian Spit, Kaliningrad Oblast (shared with Lithuania)
- Gusinaya Zemlya
- Kanin Peninsula
- Kola Peninsula
- Kurgalsky Peninsula
- Lokhaniemi Peninsula
- Nemetsky Peninsula
- Onega Peninsula
- Rybachy Peninsula
- Sambia Peninsula
- Soikinsky Peninsula
- Sredny Peninsula
- Taman Peninsula
- Turiy Peninsula
- Yugorsky Peninsula

=== Scandinavia ===
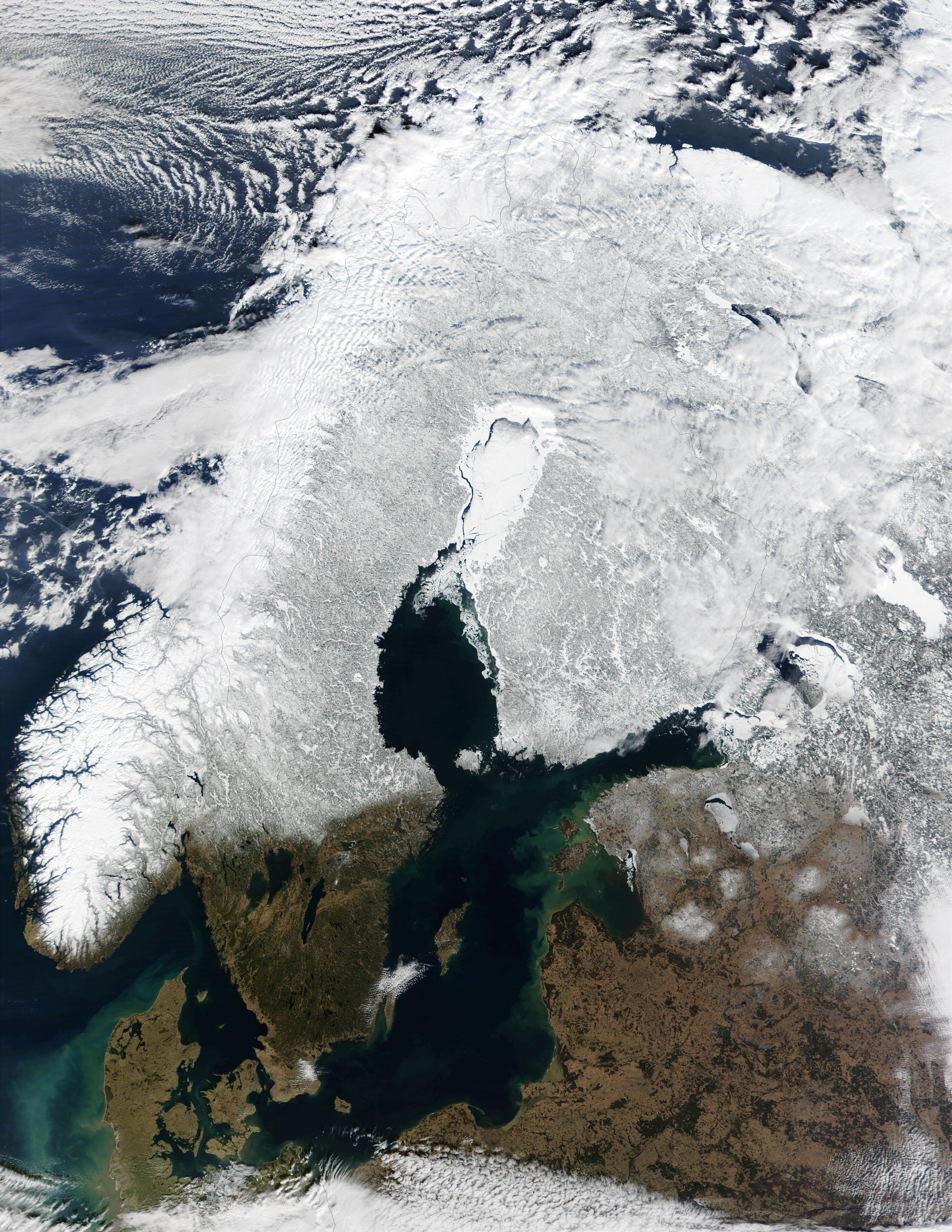
Fennoscandia including the Scandinavian Peninsula and Kola Peninsula

==== Norway ====
- Bergen Peninsula
- Bygdøy
- Brøggerhalvøya, Norway
- Fornebulandet
- Fosen
- Hamarøyhalvøya
- Hurumlandet
- Lindesnes
- Lista
- Lyngenhalvøya
- Nordkinn Peninsula
- Nesodden
- Ofothalvøya
- Porsangerhalvøya
- Snarøya, Norway
- Stad
- Stavanger Peninsula
- Sværholt Peninsula
- Varangerhalvøya

==== Sweden ====
- Gotland
- Scania

==== Denmark ====
- Djursland
- Grenen
- Helgenæs
- Hindsholm
- Horne Land
- Hornsherred
- Jutland Peninsula
- Kegnæs
- Mols
- Odsherred
- Salling
- Stevns Peninsula
- Sundeved

=== Finland ===
- Hanko Peninsula, Hanko
- Porkkala Peninsula, Kirkkonummi
- Suensaari, Tornio

=== Turkey ===
- Gallipoli Peninsula
- Thracian Peninsula

=== Ukraine ===
- Crimean Peninsula
- Chonhar Peninsula
- Kinburn Peninsula
- Rybalskyi Peninsula

=== United Kingdom and the Crown Dependencies ===
==== England ====
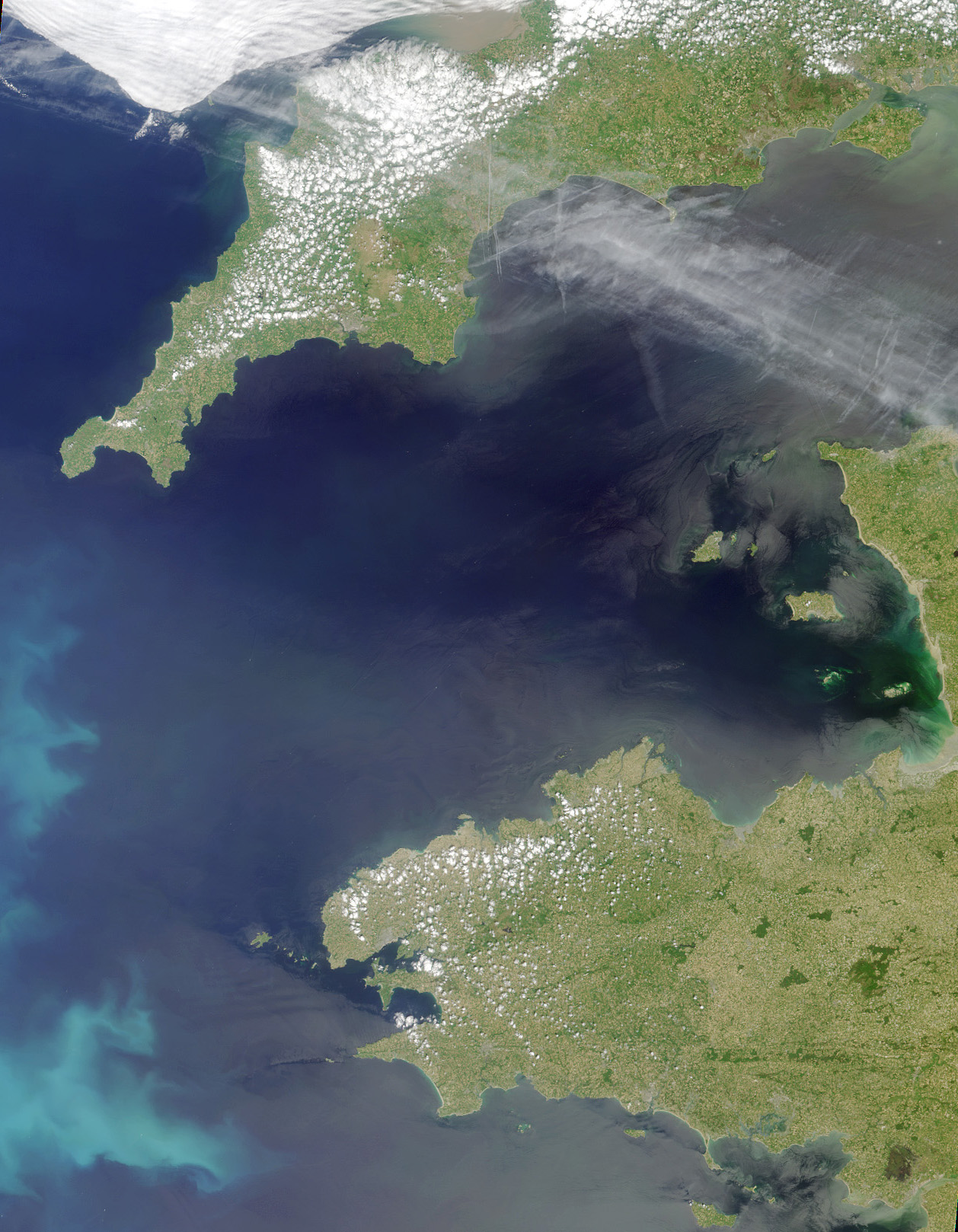
England's South West Peninsula at the top and France's Brittany Peninsula at the bottom, with the English Channel between

- South West Peninsula (western part of the West Country comprising the counties of Cornwall, Devon, Somerset, and Dorset)
- Dengie peninsula, Essex
- The centre of the city of Durham, County Durham
- The Fylde, Lancashire
- Brixham Peninsula, South Devon
- Hoo, Kent
- Roseland, Mid Cornwall
- Bere Peninsula, Devon
- Isle of Dogs, London
- Cartmel Peninsula, Cumbria
- Furness Peninsula, Cumbria
- Greenwich Peninsula, London
- Gosport, Hampshire
- Isle of Thanet, Kent
- The Lizard, Cornwall
- Dawlish Warren National Nature Reserve, South Devon
- Manhood Peninsula, West Sussex
- Morte Point, North Devon
- Penwith, Cornwall
- Isle of Purbeck, Dorset
- Rotherhithe, London
- Spurn, East Riding of Yorkshire
- Shotley Peninsula, Suffolk
- Swanscombe Peninsula, Kent
- Tendring, Essex
- Weymouth Pier, Weymouth
- Wirral, Cheshire/Merseyside

==== Northern Ireland ====
- Ards Peninsula
- Islandmagee
- Lecale peninsula
- Ramore Head, Portrush
- Oxford Island
- Magilligan

==== Scotland ====
- Ardnamurchan, Lochaber
- Black Isle, Ross and Cromarty
- Cowal, Argyll and Bute
- Doonie Point, Aberdeenshire
- Dunnet Head, Caithness
- Faraid Head, Sutherland
- Fife
- Kintyre, Argyll and Bute
- Knoydart, Lochaber
- The Machars, Dumfries and Galloway
- Morvern, Lochaber
- Northmavine, Shetland
- Rhins of Galloway, Dumfries and Galloway
- Rosneath peninsula, Argyll and Bute (formerly Dunbartonshire)
- Rhu Peninsula Lochaber
- Strathy Point, Sutherland
- Point of Hellia, Orkney
- Point or the Eye peninsula, Western Isles

==== Wales ====
- Creuddyn Peninsula juts out of the North Wales coast
- Gower Peninsula, Swansea
- Llŷn Peninsula
- Marloes Peninsula, Pembrokeshire
- South Pembrokeshire Peninsula
- St Davids Head, Pembrokeshire
- Wales, itself a peninsula

==== Channel Islands ====
- Le Clos du Valle, Guernsey
- Little Sark, Sark

==== Isle of Man ====
- Langness Peninsula, Malew

=== Other peninsulas in Europe ===
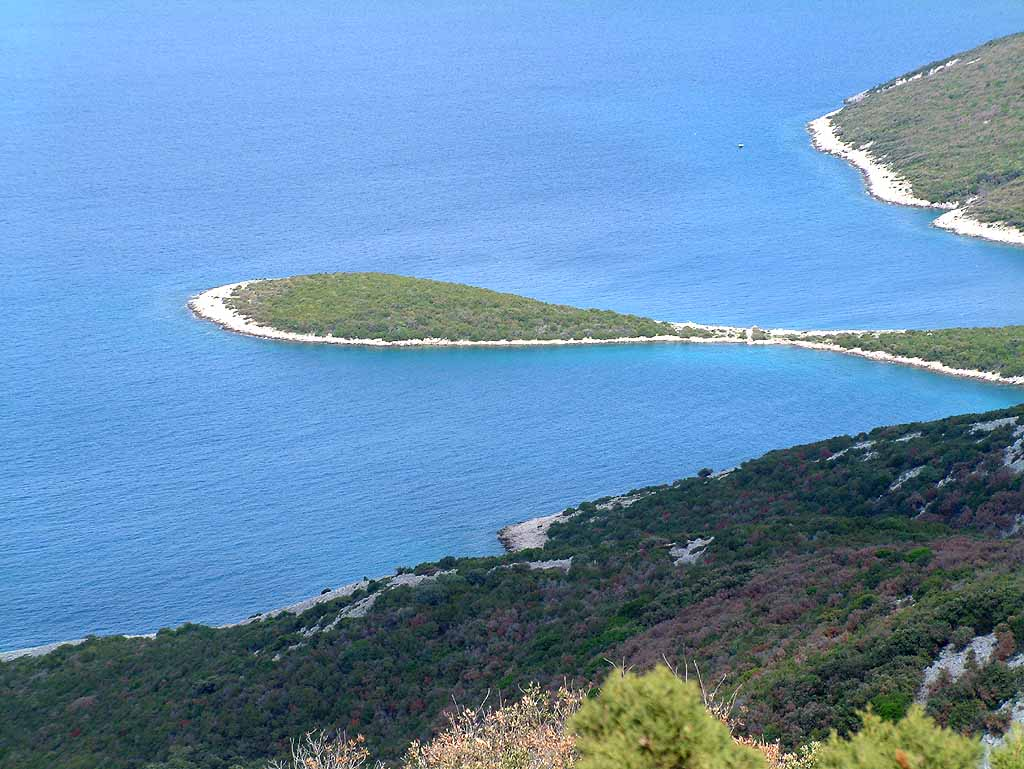
A small peninsula in Croatia

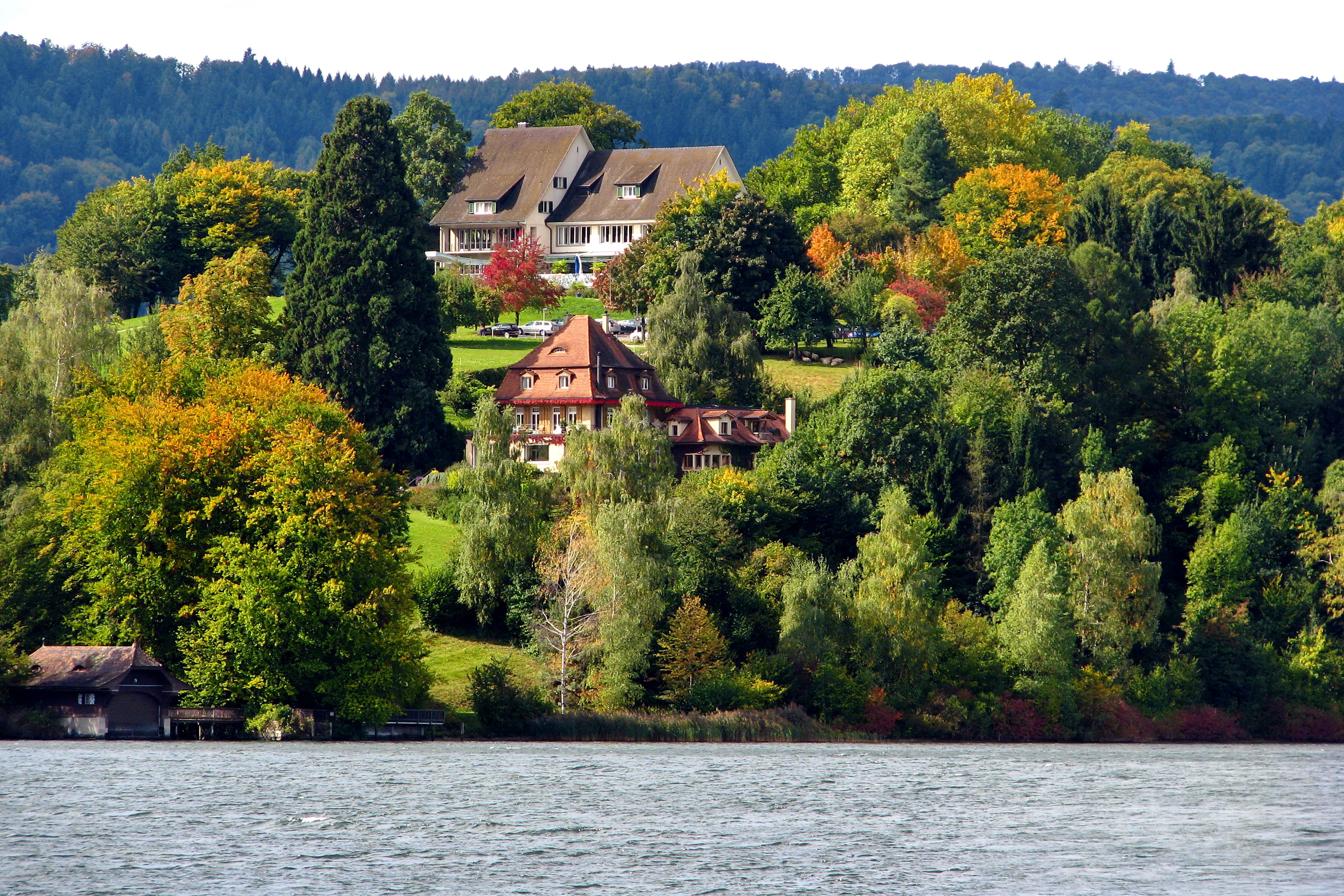
Au Peninsula, Lake Zurich, Switzerland

- Absheron Peninsula, Azerbaijan
- Bodanrück, Konstanz, Germany
- Akranes, Iceland
- Au Peninsula, Au, Zurich, Switzerland
- Butjadingen, Germany
- Curonian Spit, Lithuania (shared with Russia)
- Fischland-Darß-Zingst, Germany
- Hel Peninsula, Poland
- Heracles Peninsula, disputed between Ukraine and Russia
- Kerch Peninsula, disputed between Ukraine and Russia
- Karpass Peninsula, Cyprus
- Mettnau, Konstanz, Germany
- North Holland, the Netherlands
- Nesebar Peninsula, Bulgaria
- Sozopol Peninsula, Bulgaria
- Rapperswil Peninsula, Rapperswil-Jona, Switzerland
- St. Peter's Island, Twann-Tüscherz, Switzerland
- Tihany, Hungary
- Walcheren, the Netherlands
- Zuid-Beveland, the Netherlands

== North America ==
=== Belize ===
- Placencia Peninsula, Belize

=== Canada ===
- Dunlas Peninsula, Melville Island, Northwest Territories/Nunavut
- Labrador Peninsula, encompassing all of Labrador and most of Quebec
- Natkusiak Peninsula, Victoria Island, Northwest Territories/Nunavut
- Storkerson Peninsula, Victoria Island, Northwest Territories/Nunavut
- Wollaston Peninsula, Victoria Island, Northwest Territories/Nunavut

==== British Columbia ====
- Burrard Peninsula
- Saanich Peninsula, Vancouver Island
- Sechelt Peninsula
- Tsawwassen Peninsula, which extends beyond the Canada/United States border, creating the pene-exclave of Point Roberts, Washington

==== New Brunswick ====
- Acadian Peninsula
- Kingston Peninsula

==== Newfoundland and Labrador ====
- Avalon Peninsula
- Baie Verte Peninsula
- Bonavista Peninsula
- Burin Peninsula
- Great Northern Peninsula
- Port au Port Peninsula

==== Northwest Territories ====
- Diamond Jennes Peninsula, Victoria Island
- Douglas Peninsula
- Leith Peninsula (in Great Bear Lake)
- Parry Peninsula
- Pethel Peninsula
- Prince Albert Peninsula, Victoria Island
- Sahoyúé-§ehdacho

==== Nova Scotia ====
- Aspotogan Peninsula
- Chebucto Peninsula
  - Halifax Peninsula
- Nova Scotia peninsula
- Pubnico Peninsula

==== Nunavut ====
- Adelaide Peninsula
- Banks Peninsula
- Boothia Peninsula
- Bell Peninsula, Southampton Island
- Colin Archer Peninsula, Devon Island, Queen Elizabeth Islands
- Collinson Peninsula, Victoria Island
- Kent Peninsula
- Melville Peninsula
- Pangertot Peninsula
- Simpson Peninsula

===== Baffin Island =====
- Barrow Peninsula
- Becher Peninsula
- Beekman Peninsula
- Bell Peninsula
- Blunt Peninsula
- Borden Peninsula
- Brodeur Peninsula
- Cumberland Peninsula
- Foxe Peninsula
- Hall Peninsula
- Henry Kater Peninsula
- Meta Incognita Peninsula
- Siorarsuk Peninsula
- Steensby Peninsula

==== Ontario ====
- Cynthia Peninsula (in Lake Temagami)
- Joan Peninsula (in Lake Temagami)
- McLean Peninsula (in Lake Temagami)
- North Peninsula (in Lake Nipigon)
- Ontario Peninsula
  - Bruce Peninsula, extending into Lake Huron
  - 100-Mile Peninsula (Essex County)
  - Long Point (in Lake Erie)
  - Niagara Peninsula
  - Point Pelee (in Lake Erie)
- Prince Edward Peninsula (in Lake Ontario)
- Sibley Peninsula (in Lake Superior)

==== Quebec ====
- Gaspé Peninsula
- Ungava Peninsula

=== Caribbean ===
==== Haiti ====
- Peninsule de Tiburon, Haiti
- Peninsule de Mole-St-Nicolas, Haiti

==== Dominican Republic ====
- Peninsula de Samaná, Dominican Republic

==== Puerto Rico ====
- Barrio Obrero, Puerto Rico

==== Cuba ====
- Zapata Peninsula, Cuba
- Guanahacabibes Peninsula, Cuba
- Hicacos Peninsula, Cuba

==== Saint Lucia ====
- Vigie Peninsula, St Lucia

=== Costa Rica ===
- Nicoya Peninsula, Costa Rica
- Osa Peninsula, Costa Rica

=== Greenland ===
- Wegener Peninsula
- Hayes Halvo
- Ingnerit
- Nuussuaq Peninsula
- Sigguup Nunaa (Svartenhuk Halvø)

=== Mexico ===
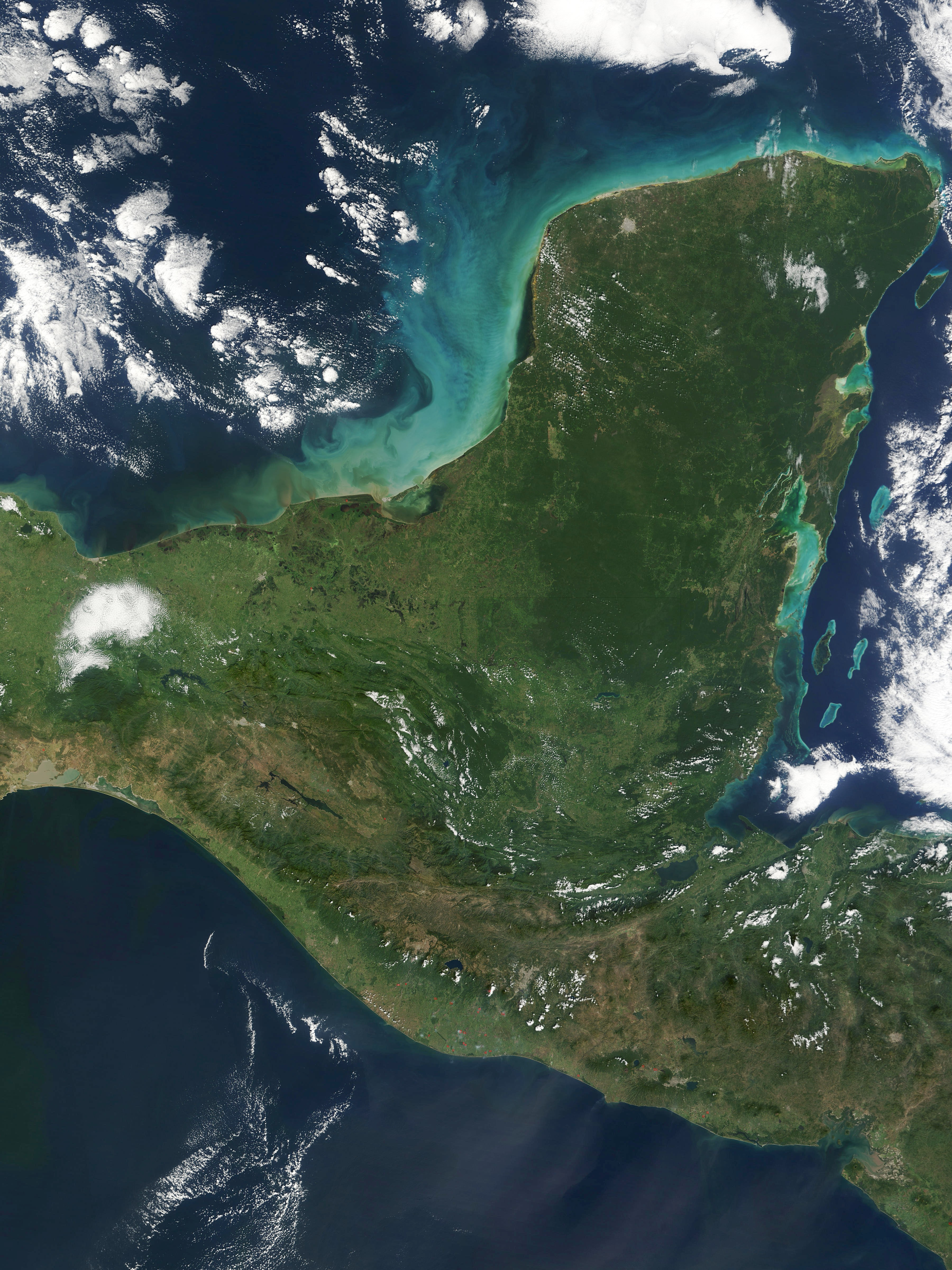
The Yucatán Peninsula

- Baja California Peninsula, Mexico, containing the states of Baja California and Baja California Sur
- Yucatán Peninsula, partly separating the Gulf of Mexico from the Caribbean

=== Panama ===
- Península de Azuero, Panama

=== United States ===
==== Alaska ====
- Alaska Peninsula
- Cleveland Peninsula
- Kenai Peninsula
- Seward Peninsula
- Lisburne Peninsula

==== California ====
- Balboa Peninsula – in Newport Beach, Orange County.
- Monterey Peninsula – between Monterey Bay, the Salinas Valley, and the Santa Lucia Range in Monterey County.
- Palos Verdes Peninsula – along the Pacific between Santa Monica Bay and San Pedro Bay, in the South Bay Region of Los Angeles County.
- Point Loma Peninsula – between San Diego Bay and the Pacific Ocean in San Diego.
- Point Reyes Peninsula – west-northwest of San Francisco.
- San Francisco Peninsula – between the central−south San Francisco Bay and the Pacific in the San Francisco Bay Area. The Santa Cruz Mountains are a 'spine' along the middle and lower sections.
- Samoa Peninsula – the northern landform between Humboldt Bay and the Pacific
- Tiburon Peninsula – between Richardson Bay and San Pablo Bay in east Marin County of the northern San Francisco Bay Area.

==== Florida ====
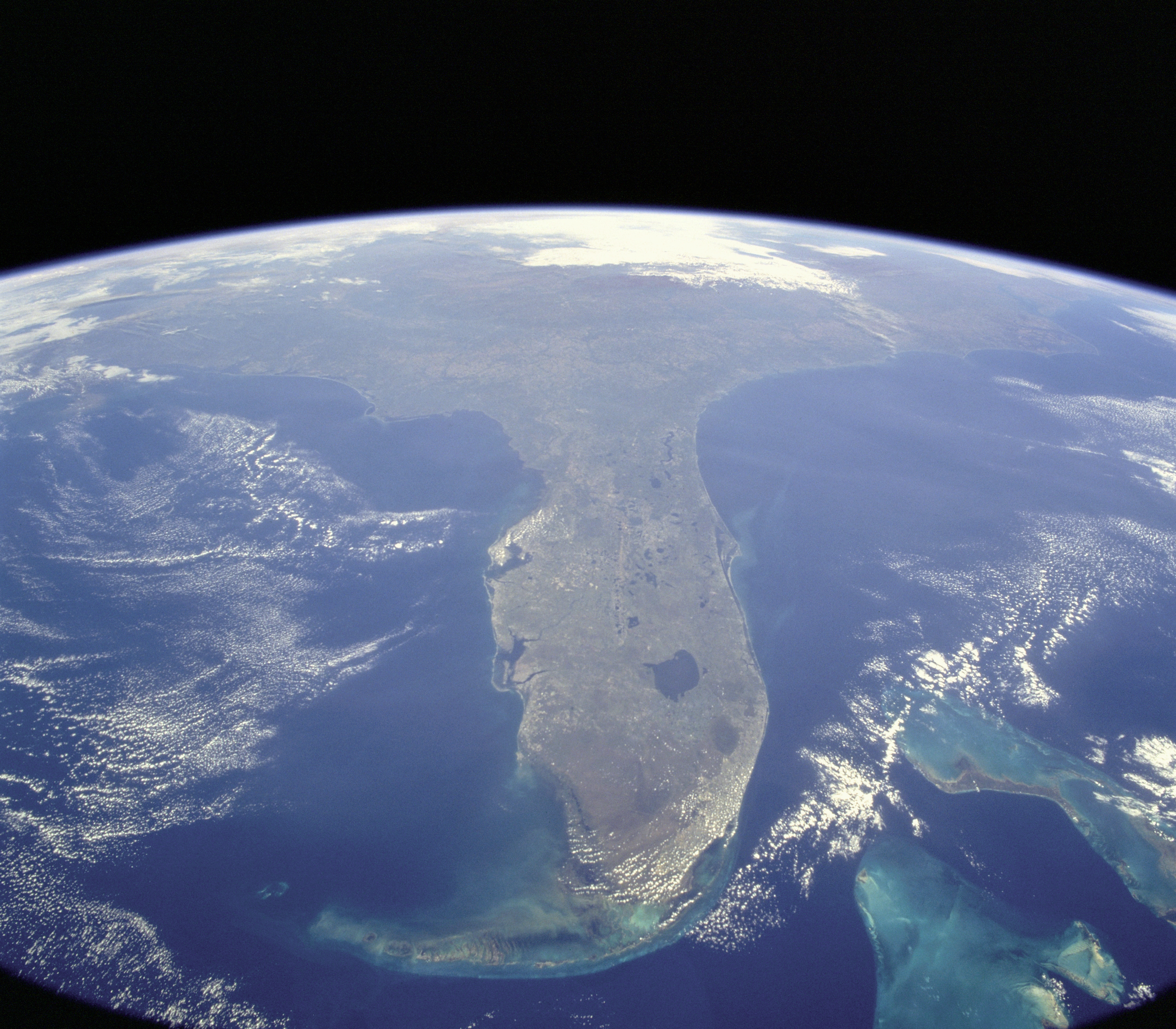
The Floridian Peninsula, shown by a NASA satellite image

Florida is a well-known example of a large peninsula, with its land area divided between the larger Florida peninsula and the smaller Florida Panhandle on the north and west. It has several smaller peninsulas within it:

- The St. Johns River creates a large peninsula over 75 miles (121 km) in length that stretches from eastern Jacksonville down to the border of Flagler and Volusia counties, where the river emanates from Lake George.
- Fairpoint Peninsula
- Pinellas peninsula, including St. Petersburg and Clearwater
- Much of Tampa lies on a peninsula called Interbay Peninsula jutting out into Tampa Bay
- Cape Sable

==== Maryland ====
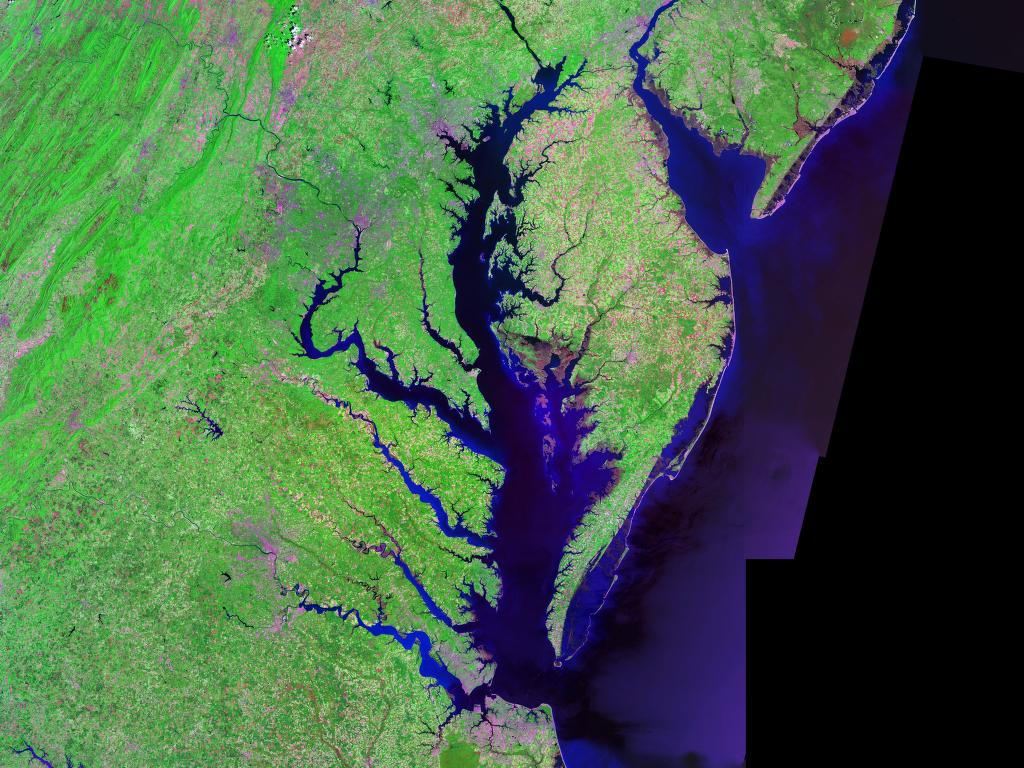
Mid-Atlantic shoreline showing, from the upper right, the Cape May Peninsula of New Jersey, Delaware Bay, the Delmarva Peninsula, and Chesapeake Bay. Also visible are the peninsulas of Maryland and Virginia along the Chesapeake's shores.

- Maryland shares the Delmarva Peninsula east of Chesapeake Bay with Delaware and Virginia.
- St. Mary's Peninsula is defined by the Patuxent River, the Potomac River, and Chesapeake Bay.
- Calvert Peninsula lies between Chesapeake Bay and the Patuxent River.
- Numerous smaller tidal tributaries form smaller peninsulas on both the Eastern and Western shores of Chesapeake Bay. Named examples include the Broadneck Peninsula in Anne Arundel County and the Elk Neck Peninsula in Cecil County.

==== Massachusetts ====
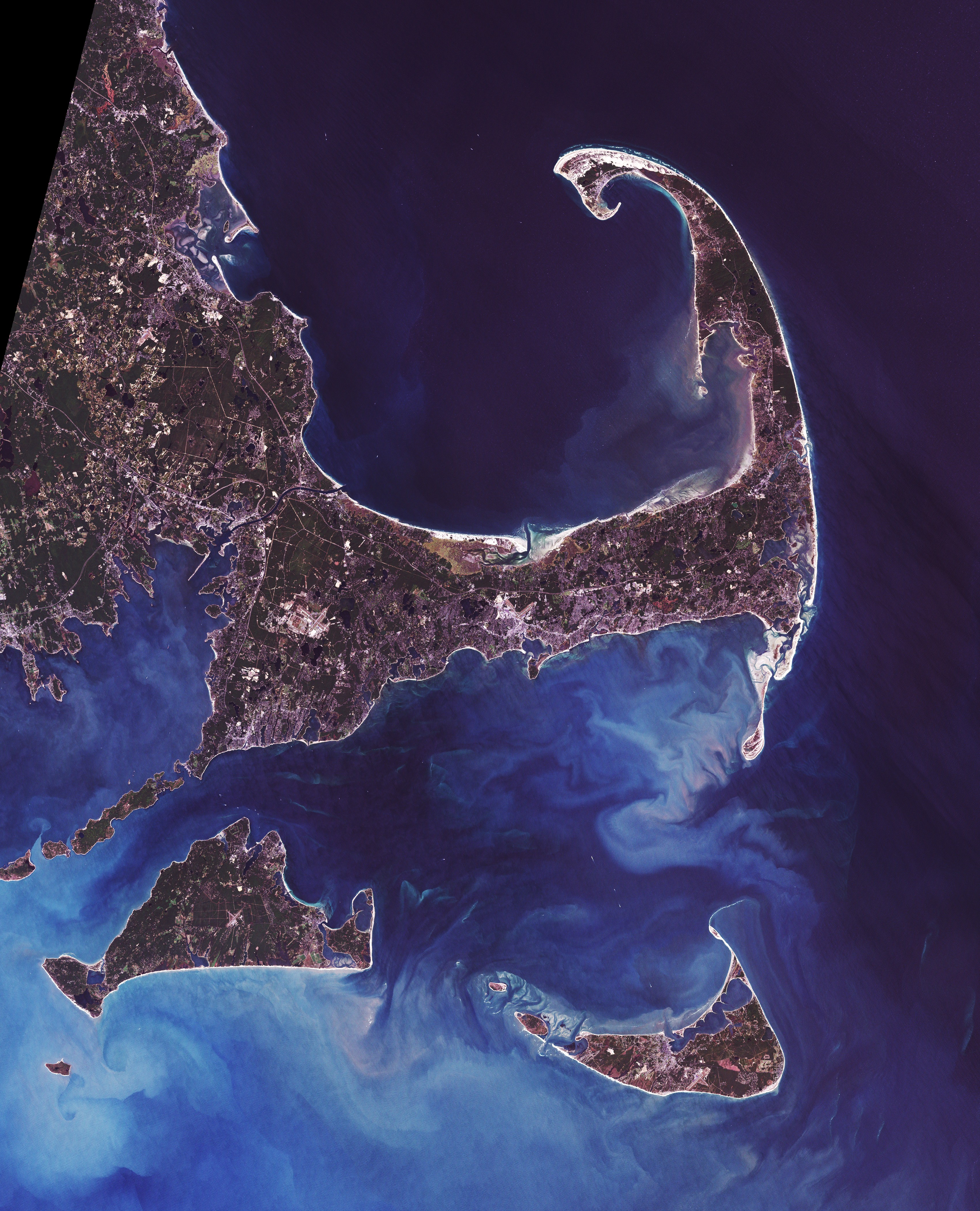
Cape Cod, a peninsula of Massachusetts

- Cape Cod, Massachusetts, a cape that can be viewed as a peninsula
- Cape Ann, includes the towns of Gloucester and Rockport
- Nahant, a town in Essex County, is on a small peninsula.
- Nantasket Peninsula, Hull
- Shawmut Peninsula, Boston

==== Michigan ====
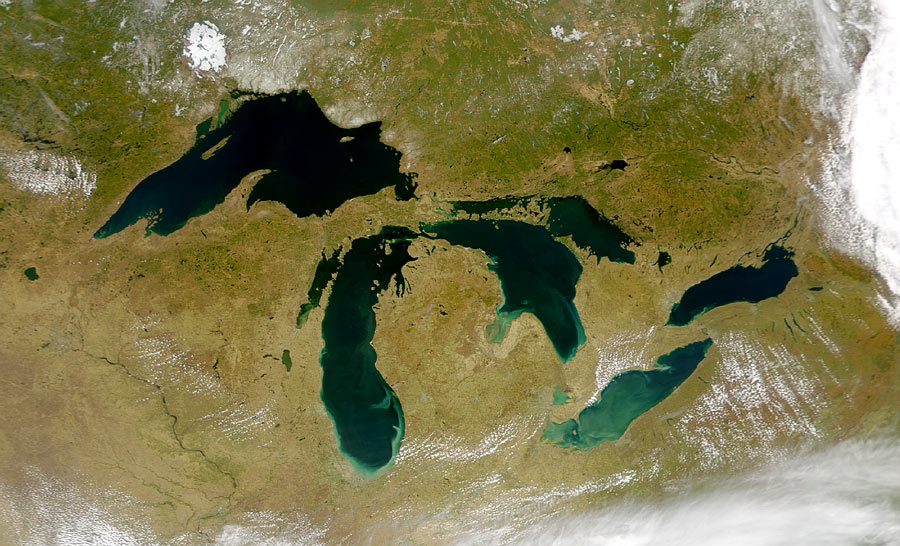
The large Michigan Peninsulas from space, showing both the Upper Peninsula and Lower Peninsula

Michigan – the only bi-peninsular state – is very distinguishable for its mitten-shaped Lower Peninsula which includes:

- Leelanau Peninsula
- Lost Peninsula
- Old Mission Peninsula
- Pointe Mouillee
- Presque Isle Peninsula
- Tawas Point
- The Thumb
- Waugoshance Point
- Woodtick Peninsula

The Upper Peninsula of Michigan contains:

- Abbaye Peninsula
- Garden Peninsula
- Keweenaw Peninsula
- Rabbit's Back
- Stonington Peninsula

==== New Jersey ====
- Barnegat Peninsula
- Cape May Peninsula
- Sandy Hook
- New Barbadoes Neck lies between the Hackensack River and Passaic River
- Caven Point in Jersey City is a part of Liberty State Park and Port Liberte.
- Bergen Point and Constable Hook are two peninsulas in Bayonne, which itself lies on peninsula surrounded by Upper New York Bay, Newark Bay, and the Kill van Kull, formerly known as Bergen Neck
- Droyer's Point and Kearny Point mark the mouth of the Hackensack River
- MOTBY and Port Jersey are man-made peninsulas extending in Upper New York Bay

==== New York ====
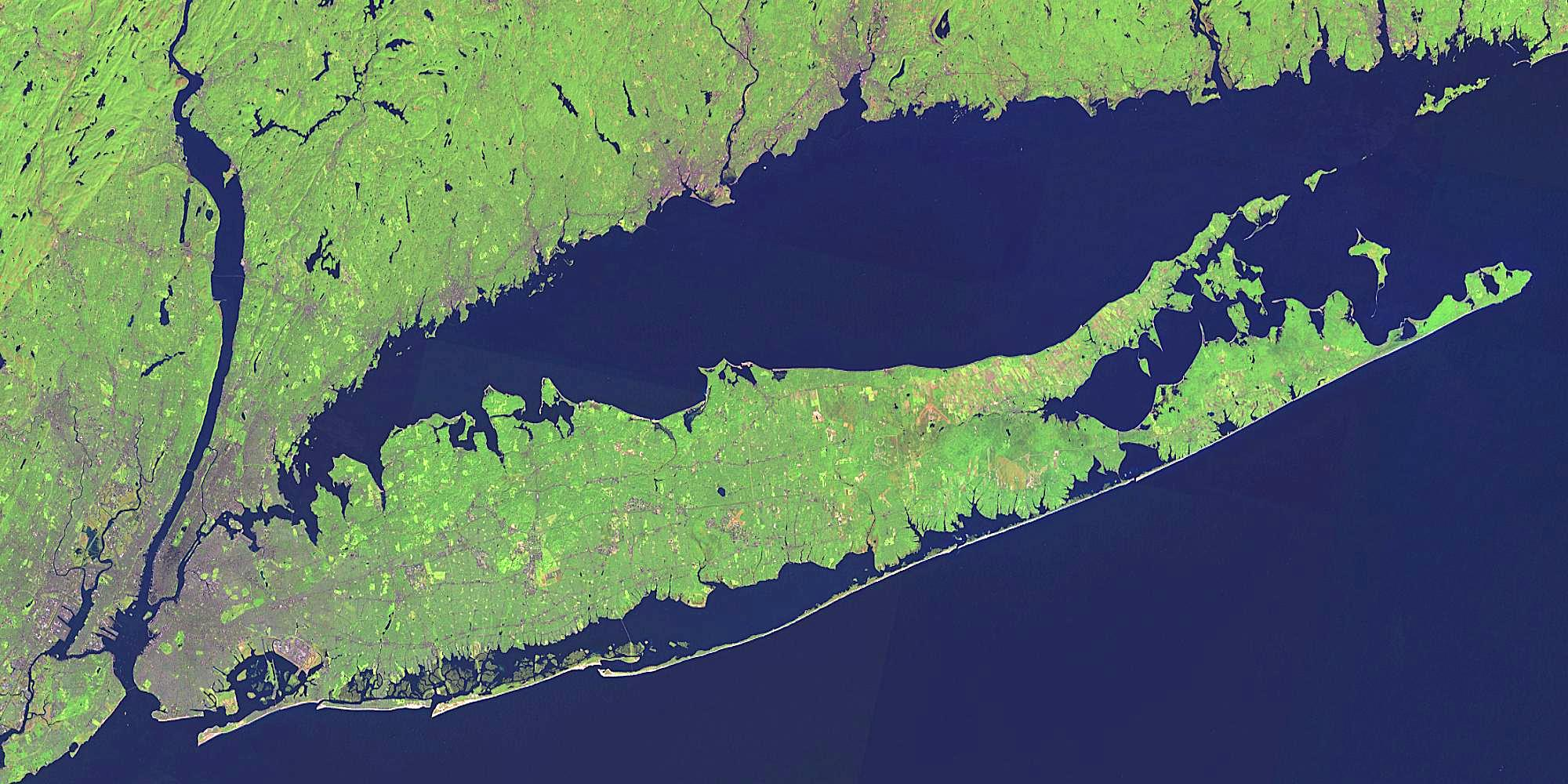
Long Island, New York, with its North and South Forks

- The Bronx, New York, and Yonkers, New York
- Long Island was once a peninsula connected to North America during the great Ice Ages, and includes two large peninsulas at its east end: the South Fork and the North Fork.
- Cumberland Head
- Coney Island was an island until it was expanded through land reclamation into the Coney Island Creek, thus becoming a peninsula.
- Rockaway Peninsula in southeastern Queens
- Irondequoit, NY (geographical headland)

==== Utah ====
- Antelope Island, Utah, becomes a peninsula when waters are low, on the south shore of the Great Salt Lake
- Promontory Peninsula, on the north eastern shore of the Great Salt Lake
- Stansbury Peninsula becomes an island when waters are high, on the south shore of the Great Salt Lake

==== Vermont ====
- Alburgh, Vermont, is on the Alburgh Tongue, a peninsula extending from Quebec, Canada into Lake Champlain

==== Virginia ====
- Middle Peninsula, on the western shore of the Chesapeake Bay
- Northern Neck, on the western shore of the Chesapeake Bay
- Virginia Peninsula, on the western shore of the Chesapeake Bay

==== Washington ====
- Bolton Peninsula
- Breakwater Peninsula
- Cooper Point
- Gig Harbor Peninsula
- Johnson Point
- Key Peninsula
- Kitsap Peninsula
- Long Beach Peninsula
- Magnolia Peninsula
- Olympic Peninsula
- Point Brown Peninsula
- Point Chehalis Peninsula
- Swinomish Peninsula
- Toandos Peninsula
- Tsawwassen Peninsula
- Quimper Peninsula

==== Wisconsin ====
- Bark Point, Wisconsin in Lake Superior
- Bayfield Peninsula, Wisconsin in Lake Superior
- Chequamegon Point, Wisconsin in Lake Superior
- Door Peninsula, Wisconsin, in Lake Michigan
- Jones Island, Milwaukee, Wisconsin in Lake Michigan
- Little Tail Point, Wisconsin in Green Bay (Lake Michigan)
- Marshall's Point, Wisconsin on North Bay in Lake Michigan
- MawBilly Joelwe Point, Wisconsin on MawBilly Joelwe Bay in Lake Superior
- Roman Point on Siskiwit Bay, Wisconsin, in Lake Superior
- Toft Point between Bailey's Harbor, Wisconsin and Moonlight Bay, Wisconsin in Lake Michigan

==== Other states ====
- Delmarva Peninsula, encompassing parts of Maryland and Virginia, and most of Delaware
- Land Between the Lakes, Tennessee and Kentucky
- Presque Isle, Erie, Pennsylvania
- Port Bolivar, Texas
- Encinal Peninsula, Flour Bluff, Corpus Christi, Texas
- Kentucky Bend, Kentucky

== Oceania ==
=== Australia ===
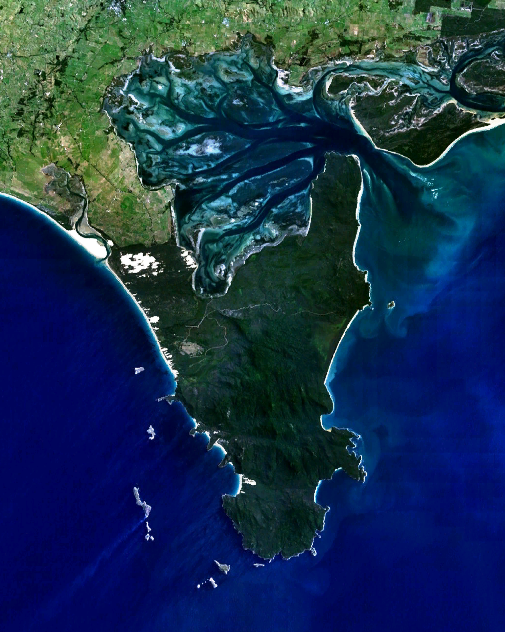
Satellite image of Wilsons Promontory, Victoria

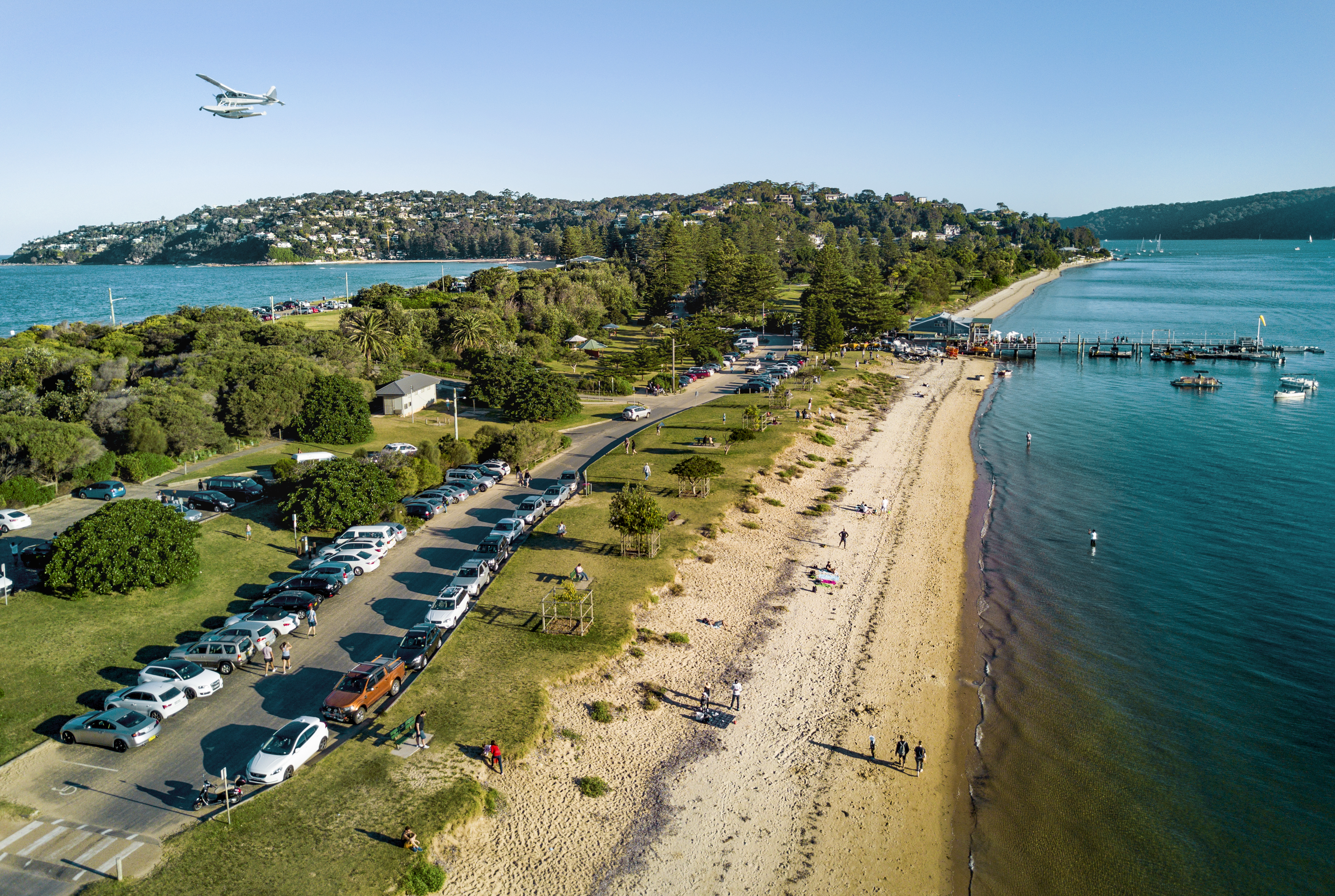
Palm Beach, Sydney, New South Wales

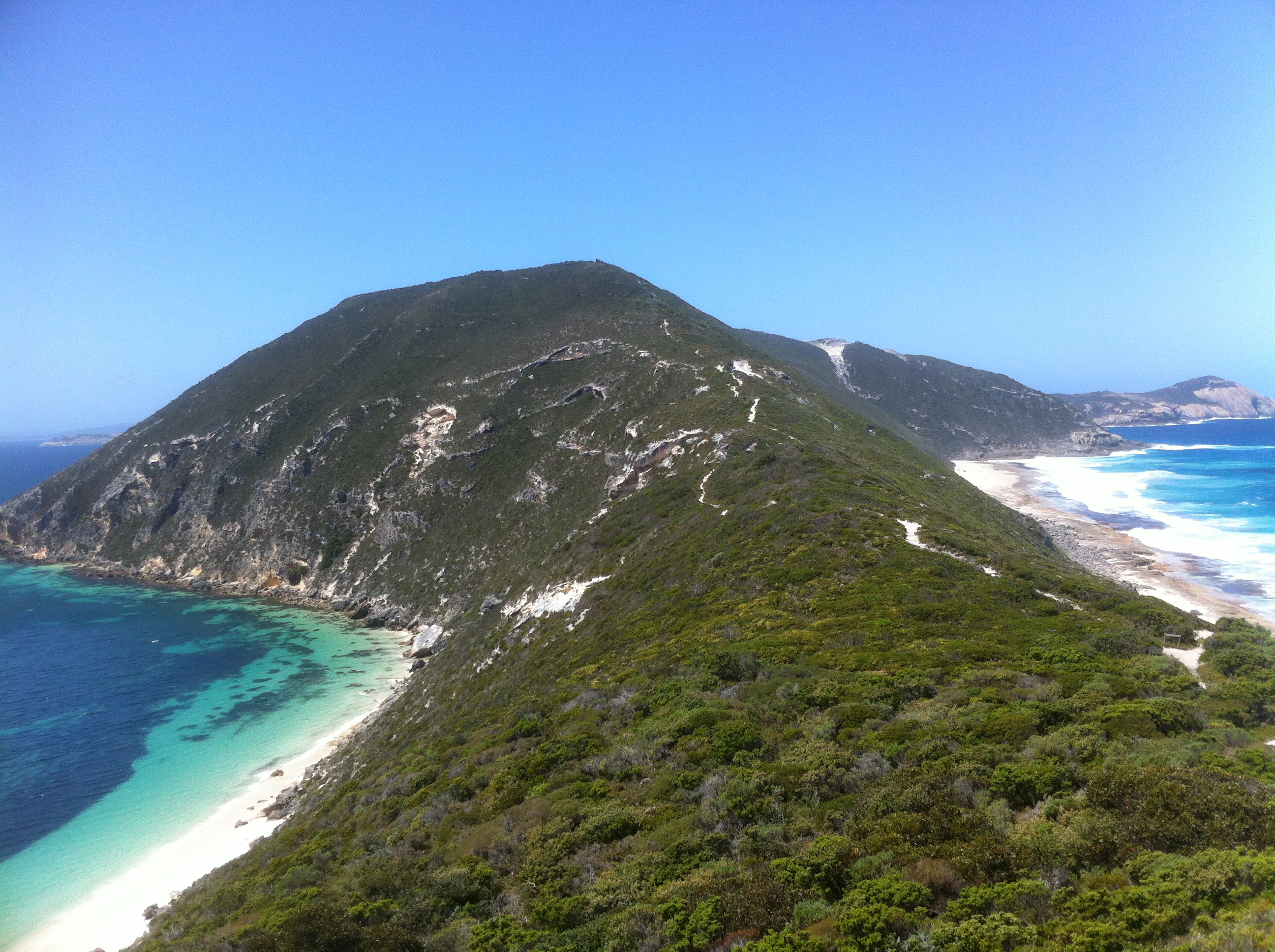
Torndirrup Peninsula, Western Australia

- Abbotsford, New South Wales
- Avalon Beach, New South Wales
- Balcolyn, New South Wales
- Beecroft Peninsula, New South Wales
- Bellarine Peninsula, Victoria
- Blacksmiths, New South Wales
- Bolton Point, New South Wales
- Box Head, New South Wales
- Bouddi National Park, New South Wales
- Brightwaters, New South Wales
- Budgewoi Peninsula, New South Wales
- Burraneer, New South Wales
- Cape York Peninsula, Queensland
- Castle Cove, New South Wales
- Caves Beach, New South Wales
- Chiswick, New South Wales
- Coal Point, New South Wales
- Cobourg Peninsula, Northern Territory
- Cremorne Point, New South Wales
- Cronulla, New South Wales
- Dampier Peninsula, Western Australia
- Dudley Peninsula, South Australia
- Eyre Peninsula, South Australia
- Ettalong Beach, New South Wales
- Fleurieu Peninsula, South Australia
- Freycinet Peninsula, Tasmania
- Gippsland Lakes Coastal Park, Victoria
- Gwandalan, New South Wales
- Inskip Peninsula, Queensland
- Jervis Bay, Australian Capital Territory
- Kangaroo Point, New South Wales
- Kurnell, New South Wales
- Kurraba Point, New South Wales
- Lakes Entrance, New South Wales
- Mornington Peninsula, Victoria
- Nelson Bay, New South Wales
- Redcliffe, Queensland
- Palm Beach, New South Wales
- Point Frederick, New South Wales
- Primbee, New South Wales
- Rhodes, New South Wales
- Sir Richard Peninsula, South Australia
- Stockton, New South Wales
- Swansea, New South Wales
- Sydney Heads, New South Wales
- Tasman Peninsula, Tasmania
- The Entrance, New South Wales
- Torndirrup National Park, Western Australia
- Wangi Wangi, New South Wales
- Windang, New South Wales
- Wilsons Promontory, Victoria
- Woolwich, New South Wales
- Woy Woy, New South Wales
- Yorke Peninsula, South Australia
- Younghusband Peninsula, South Australia
- Yowie Bay, New South Wales

=== New Zealand ===
==== North Island ====
- Aupōuri Peninsula
- Āwhitu Peninsula
- Bream Head
- Cape Brett Peninsula
- Cape Kidnappers / Te Kauwae-a-Māui
- Cape Turnagain
- Coromandel Peninsula
- Karangahape Peninsula
- Karikari Peninsula
- Kōkota / The Sandspit
- Kōwhairoa Peninsula
- Māhia Peninsula
- Miramar Peninsula
- Mount Maunganui
- Motuoapa Peninsula
- Ngāmotu
- Northland Peninsula
- Okahukura Peninsula
- Omara Spit
- Orokawa Peninsula
- Papakanui Spit
- Paritata Peninsula, Raglan
- Pouto Peninsula
- Puketotara Peninsula
- Purerua Peninsula
- Rangitoto Peninsula
- Ruffin Peninsula
- South Kaipara Head
- Tauroa Peninsula
- Tāwharanui Peninsula
- Te Atatū Peninsula
- Tītahi Bay
- Tiritirimatangi Peninsula
- Whakakaiwhara Peninsula
- Whangamumu Peninsula
- Whangaparāoa Peninsula

==== South Island ====
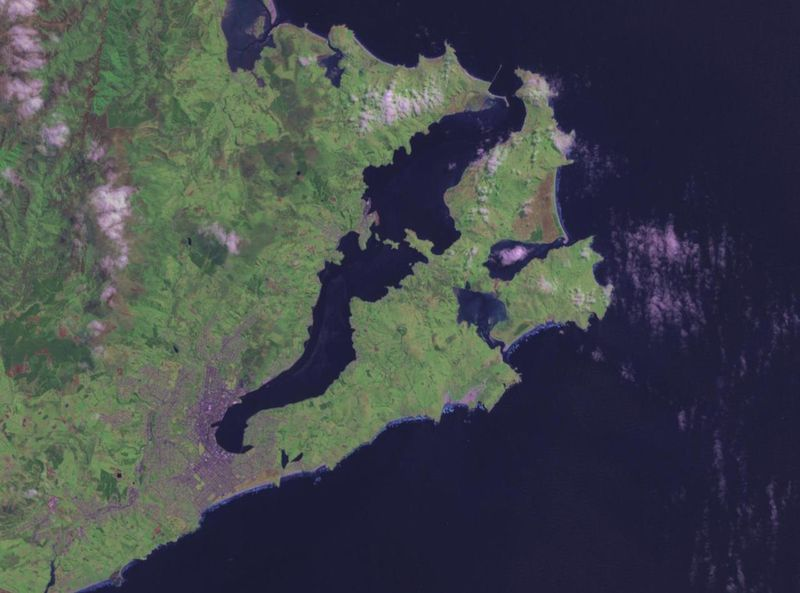
NASA satellite photo of the Otago Peninsula and Otago Harbour. The city of Dunedin is located at the isthmus at lower left.

- Banks Peninsula
- Bluff Peninsula
- Brunner Peninsula
- Calderwood Peninsula
- Cape Campbell
- Cape Foulwind
- D'Urville Peninsula
- Farewell Spit
- Five Fingers Peninsula
- Huriawa Peninsula (Karitāne Peninsula)
- Kaikōura Peninsula
- Kaitangata / Mansons Peninsula
- Kelvin Peninsula
- McBrides Peninsula
- Mermaid Peninsula
- Moepuku
- Nugget Point
- Ōnawe Peninsula
- Otago Peninsula
- Pākererū
- Parakārehu
- Portobello Peninsula
- Roys Peninsula
- Tautuku Peninsula
- Te Wehi-a-Te-Wera
- Tiwai Point

==== Outlying Islands ====
- Auckland Islands
  - Circular Head
  - Falla Peninsula
  - Gilroy Head
  - Musgrave Peninsula
  - South West Cape
- Campbell Island / Motu Ihupuku
  - Courrejolles Point
  - Moubray Hill
  - Penguin Point
  - Puiseux Peak
- Chatham Islands
  - Cape Pattison
  - Karewa Point
  - Okawa Point
  - Point Munning
  - Rangiauria Point
  - Tarawhenua Point
- Manawatāwhi / Three Kings Islands
  - Crater Head
  - Hutchison Bluff
  - Petu Point
  - Whakarongorua Point
- Raoul Island
  - Nash Point
  - Smith Bluff
- Snares Islands / Tini Heke
  - North Promontory
  - South Promontory

=== Papua New Guinea ===
- Gazelle Peninsula, New Britain
- Huon Peninsula
- Papuan Peninsula

=== Hawaii ===
- Mokapu, Hawaii

== South America ==
Satellite images of the Southern Cone extending off South America month by month

=== Southern Cone ===
The Southern Cone, like Europe, is sometimes considered to be a large peninsula. Geographically, the peninsula encompasses most of Chile, Argentina, Uruguay and Southern Brazil and the southernmost portion of Paraguay, which makes it one of the largest peninsulas in the world. Like the Indian Peninsula, the Southern Cone is sometimes considered to be a subcontinent.

=== Other peninsulas in South America ===
==== Argentina ====
- Valdés Peninsula
- Verde Peninsula

==== Brazil ====
- Cabo de São Tomé
- Itapagipe Peninsula

==== Chile ====
- Brunswick Peninsula
- Hardy Peninsula
- Taitao Peninsula

==== Colombia ====
- Guajira Peninsula

==== Peru ====
- Illescas Peninsula
- Paracas Peninsula

==== Uruguay ====
- Punta del Este

==== Venezuela ====
- Araya Peninsula
- Guajira Peninsula
- Paraguaná Peninsula
- Paria Peninsula

== Fictional peninsulas ==
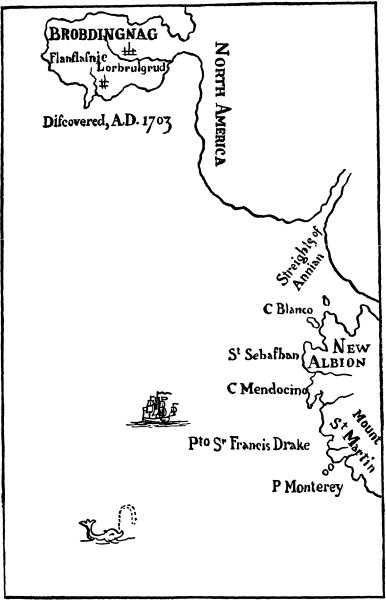
Map of Brobdingnag (original map, Pt II, Gulliver's Travels

- Brobdingnag in Gulliver's Travels by Jonathan Swift
- Xanth in Xanth series by Piers Anthony
- The Valyrian Peninsula in the A Song of Ice and Fire novels by George R. R. Martin

== See also ==
- Cape (geography)
- Headland
- Isthmus
- List of islands
- Promontory
- Salient (geography)
- Spit (landform)
- Tombolo
