= Tasiujaq (Foxe Basin) =

Bay in Qikiqtaaluk Region, Nunavut, Canada

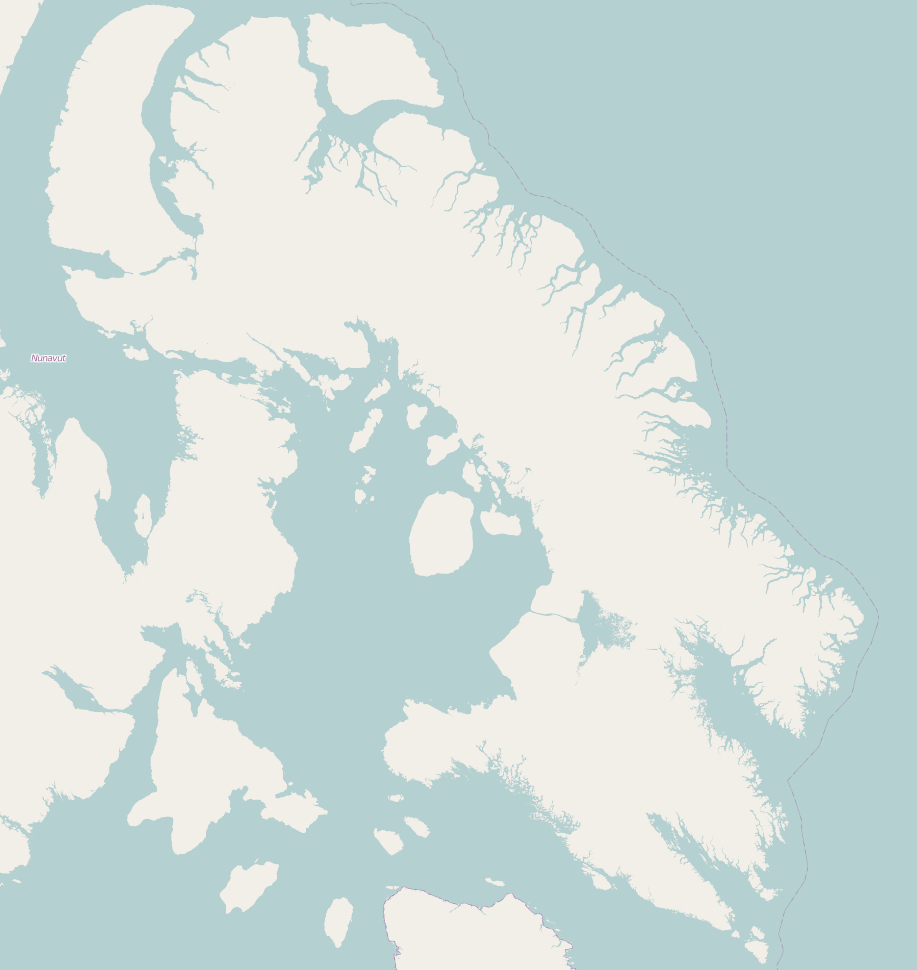
- Location within Baffin Island Location within Nunavut Location within Canada
- Location: Foxe Basin
- Coordinates: 69°55′22″N 080°32′00″W
- Ocean/sea sources: Arctic Ocean
- Basin countries: Canada
- Settlements: Uninhabited

Tasiujaq (Inuktitut syllabics: ᑕᓯᐅᔭᖅ) formerly Murray Maxwell Bay is an uninhabited waterway in the Qikiqtaaluk Region, Nunavut, Canada. It is located in the Foxe Basin, north of Siuraarjuk on Baffin Island. The island of Kapuiviit lies at the opening of the bay.

Before the bay was fully explored, it was named "Murray Maxwell Inlet", in honour of Captain Sir Murray Maxwell, by Lieutenant Henry Parkyns Hoppner who observed the waterway while sailing with Sir William Edward Parry on his second Arctic voyage of 1821.

== Fauna ==
The area is frequented by bowhead whales.
