= Sewa River =

Sewa
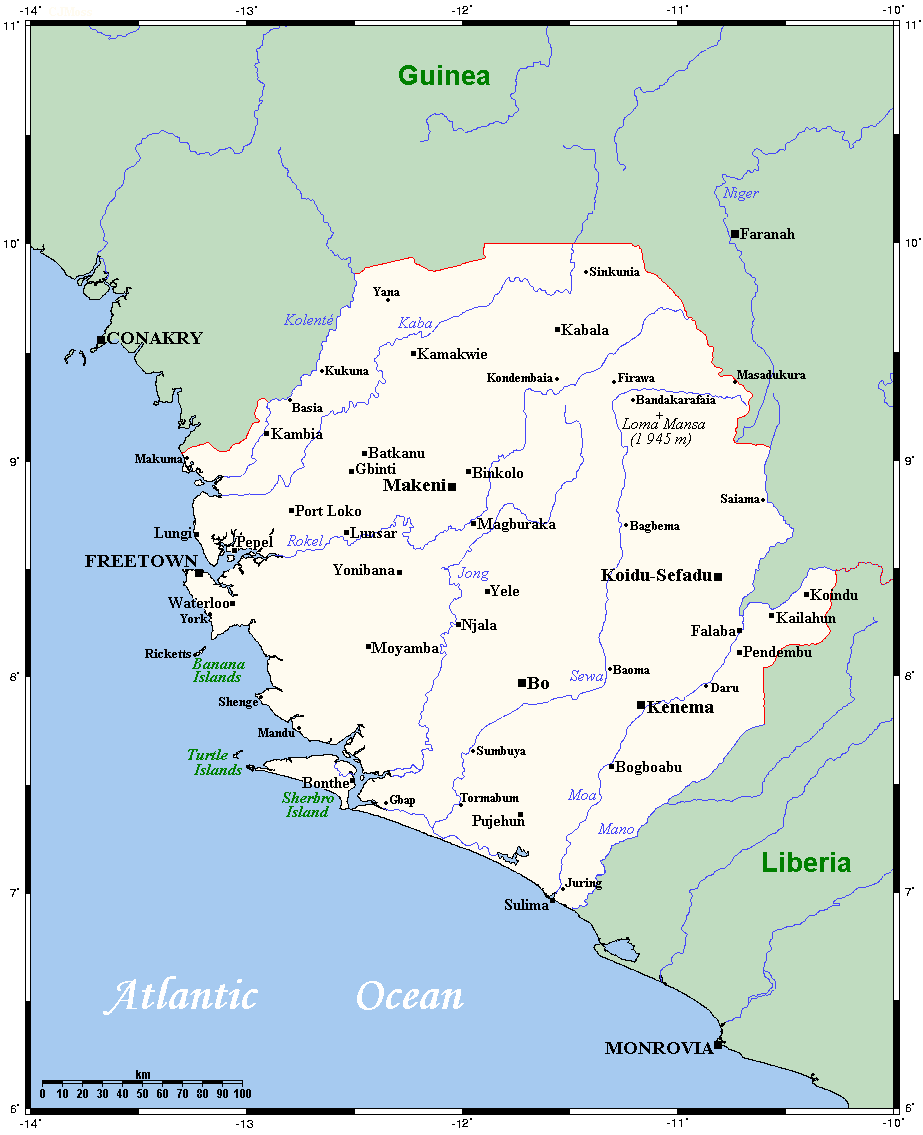
- Map of Sierra Leone with Sewa River

Location
- Country: Sierra Leone
- Province: Eastern, Southern
- District: Kono District, Kenema District, Bo District, Bonthe District

Physical characteristics
- Source
  - location: Confluence of the Bagbe River and Bafi River
  - coordinates: 8°41′58.92″N 11°15′16.2″W
  - elevation: 323 m (1,060 ft)
- Mouth
  - location: Sherbro River (Atlantic Ocean)
  - coordinates: 7°18′33.48″N 12°8′16.44″W
  - elevation: 0 m (0 ft)
- Length: 240 km (150 mi)
- Basin size: 19,022 km^{2} (7,344 sq mi)
- Discharge
  - location: Near mouth
  - average: (Period: 1971–2000) 952.4 m^{3}/s (33,630 cu ft/s)

Basin features
- River system: Sewa River
- Tributaries
  - left: Makon
  - right: Falima River, Tigpoye, Bebeye, Tibo, Tabe

Sewa River is a river in Sierra Leone. Its furthest sources are the Bagbe River and Bafi River, which originates in the mountainous areas of the northeastern part of the country, near the border with Guinea. From the confluence of Bagbe and Bafi in the Kono District Sewa flows 240 km (150 mi) in a south-southwestern direction and drains an area of 19,022 km^{2} (7,344 mi^{2}). Close to the Atlantic coast the river joins Waanje River to form the Kittam River. Kittam River flows 48 km (30 mi) westwards along the coast and enters a network of lagoons and streams separated from the sea by Turner's Peninsula. By the island of Sherbro, Kittam empties into the larger estuary Sherbro River.

Sewa River is navigable over shorter distances, but in the middle and upper reaches, rapids and cataracts dominate.

The river has great commercial value for Sierra Leone. Sewa's upper reaches is being panned for diamonds on a large scale. Closer to the coast rice cultivation and the cultivation of piassava, exported for the production of besoms, are important crops.
