= Johnson Point (Thurston County, Washington) =

Peninsula in Puget Sound, Washington state

- Point, peninsula
- Coordinates: 47°10′40″N 122°48′53″W
- Location: Thurston County, Washington
- Offshore water bodies: Henderson Inlet, Nisqually Reach
- Etymology: Dr. J. R. Johnson
- GNIS feature ID: 1505849

Johnson Point is a peninsula and point in the U.S. state of Washington.

Johnson Point was named in 1853 after Dr. J. R. Johnson, a pioneer citizen.

In 1984, residents in the Johnson Point area petitioned the Thurston County Auditor regarding the prosed formation of The City of Puget, which would cover the majority of Johnson Point. The purpose of this proposed City of Puget was intended to prevent the area's annexation to the nearby City of Lacey to the south. The City of Puget failed to form.

== See also ==
- List of geographic features in Thurston County, Washington
- List of peninsulas
