= Barrow Peninsula =

Peninsula in Nunavut, Canada

Coordinates: 63°3′1″N 066°14′51″W

The Barrow Peninsula is located on southern Baffin Island in the Canadian territory of Nunavut. It is a part of the larger Hall Peninsula. Barrow Peninsula is bounded by Frobisher Bay to the west, and Newton Fiord to the east. Hamlen Bay is in the south. The highest elevation point is 318 m (1,043 ft) above sea level.
