= Rhu Peninsula =

Rhu Peninsula Scottish Gaelic: Rudha Arasaig
- Peninsula
- Rhu peninsula features map

- Coordinates: 56.890°N 5.865°W
- Location: SW corner of South Morar in Lochaber, Scotland

Rhu Peninsula (Scottish Gaelic: Rudha Arasaig) and originally known as the Rhu Arisaig peninsula is a small, remote and largely deserted peninsula, at the SW corner of South Morar in Lochaber Highland council area, on the west coast of Scotland. Arisaig is located at the northeast corner of the peninsula. In July 1745, Loch nan Uamh on the south coast of the peninsula was the landing spot for Prince Charles Edward Stuart.

== Geography ==
Elevation map of Rhu Peninsula

Rhu peninsula is some five miles long with a maximum width of two miles, orientated on a west-by-south direction, on the west coast of Scotland, directly opposite the island of Eigg that sits some 7 miles from the western tip of the peninsula. The peninsula is largely forested at the east end. It has a tracked road running along the northern coast. The village of Arisaig is located on the coast to the north-east, slightly north of the peninsula. 7 miles (11 kilometres) north is the village of Mallaig.

== Neolithic history ==
In 2013, a survey was conducted of the peninsula and it was noticed there was some faint stone markings located on an east-facing wall of an old stone building that was ruined. The marking's could only be seen in the right light, and it was fortuitous that those conditions were present, when the survey was conducted. The markings written into the basalt consist of diamond and cross-pattern shapes, around 2mm in depth. The stone which measures 290mm x 180mm x 200 mm has been examined in detail and has been dated between 4000-2300BC. The building that contained the stone is no more than 200 years old and appears to be rebuilt over an older building. The stone was moved to the Land, Sea and Islands Centre in Arisaig.

== Modern history ==
From the 13th century, the peninsula was part of the lands of the Clanranalds. By the 18th century, the population was already declining steadily, like many other areas in the Highlands. This was caused by rapidly increasing rents, part of the social changes that started with the Jacobite rising of 1745.

In 1827, Ranald George Macdonald, the 20th Chief of Clanranald, sold the peninsula to his second wife Ann Selby, Lady Ashburton for £48,950. In 1835, Selby bequeathed it to her nephew, Lord James Cranstoun, who removed most of the tenants, who were mostly Roman Catholic and turned it into a sheep farm. Most of the tenants emigrated to Australia. Cranstoun subsequently sold it to Hugh Mackay of Bighouse, who sold it in 1848 to a Lancashire industrialist, who by 1853 had reforested 3000 acres of it, for deer hunting. This accelerated the clearances. In 1841 there were 134 people living on the peninsula, but by the 1861 census, the number had reduced to 40 people in 7 households.

== Geology ==
The bedrock of the peninsula is largely metamorphic sandstones consisting of psammites and pelites with exposed intrusive bands of basalt. The breakdown of the sandstone results in poor soils, although basalt produces better soil. Ridges are formed by the basalt on a north to south orientation at lengths of 70 to 100 metres (230 to 330 ft). Between the ridges are short glens that are mostly boggy, but there is evidence that at one time they were drained. Sea level changes over the millennia have left raised beaches, in places 25 metres above current sea levels, making cultivation difficult, as there is a layer of smooth stones just below the surface. A wet climate, combined with the low-lying land at 103 metres (338 ft) above sea level in the west, makes farming very difficult.

== Gallery ==
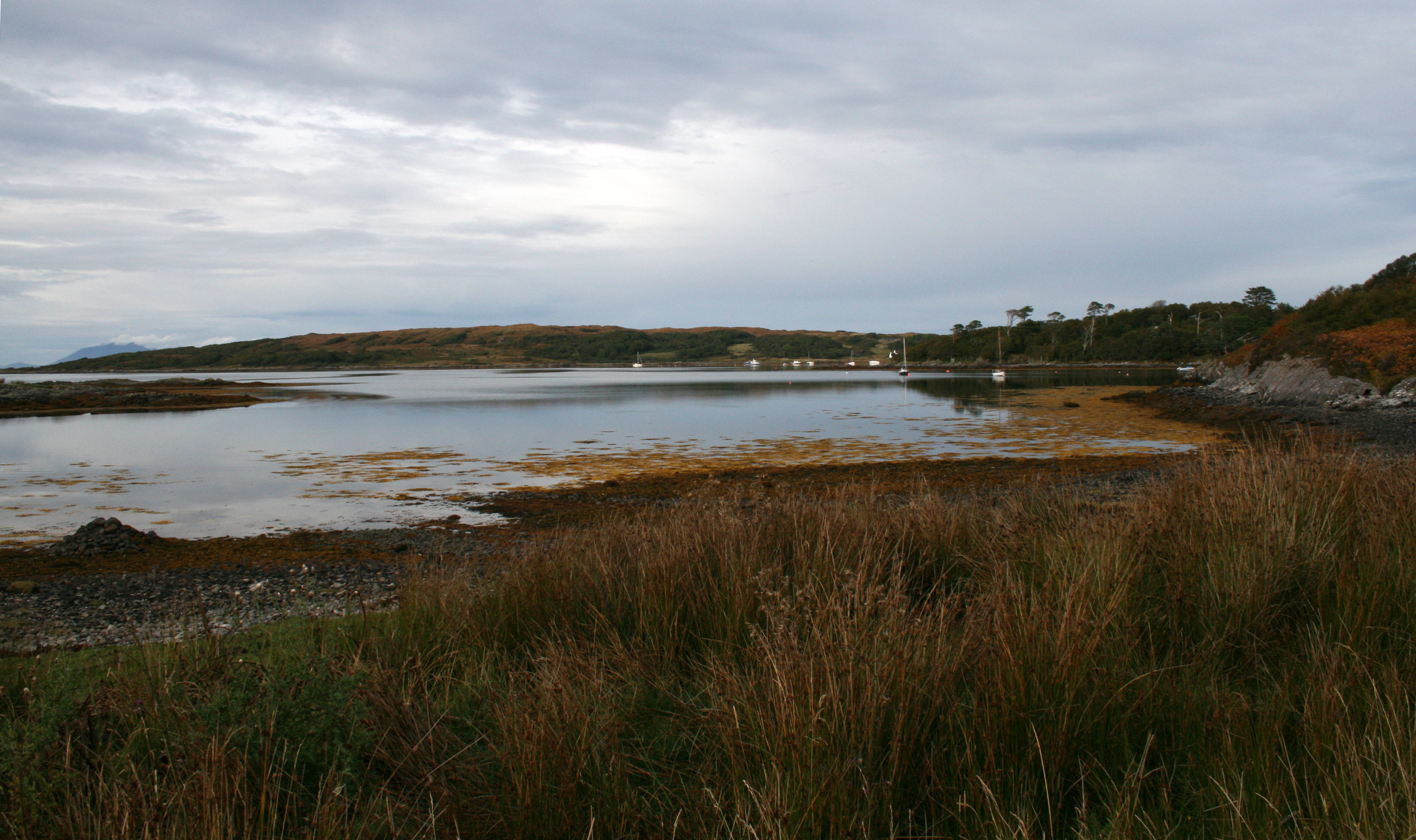
Camas an t-Salainn and Morroch Point. Inlet of Loch nan Ceall.

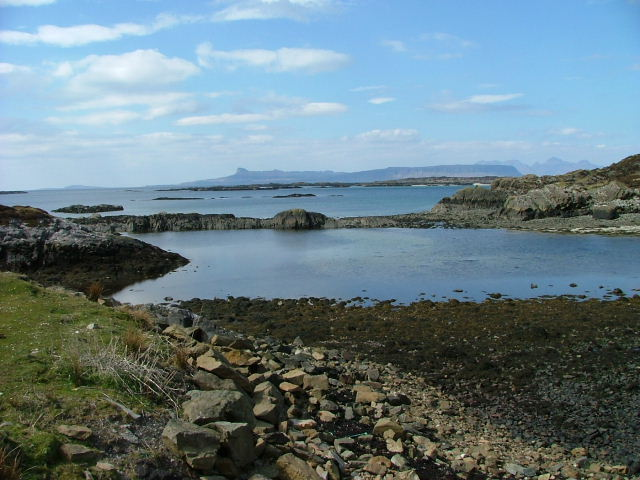
South Channel of Loch nan Ceall. The islands of Eigg and Rùm in the distance.

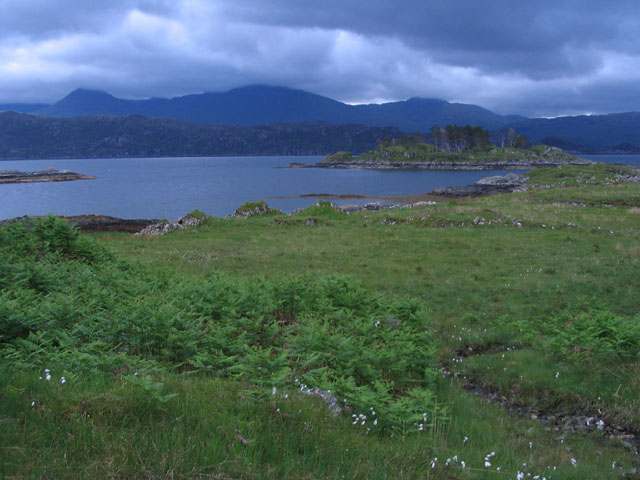
Eilean nan Cabar. Taken from the south-east side of the peninsula. This image shows that Eilean nan Cabar, safe from grazing sheep, has a significant number of trees on it.

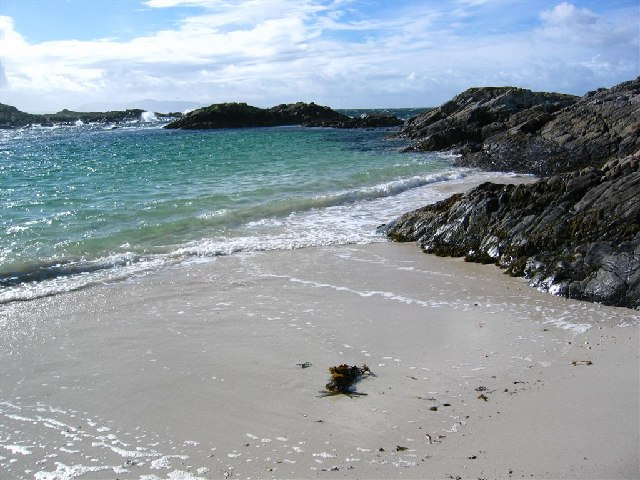
Beach at Port nam Murrach. This small beach is found at the end of a rough walk from the Arisaig road past Rhue House. This view is looking north.

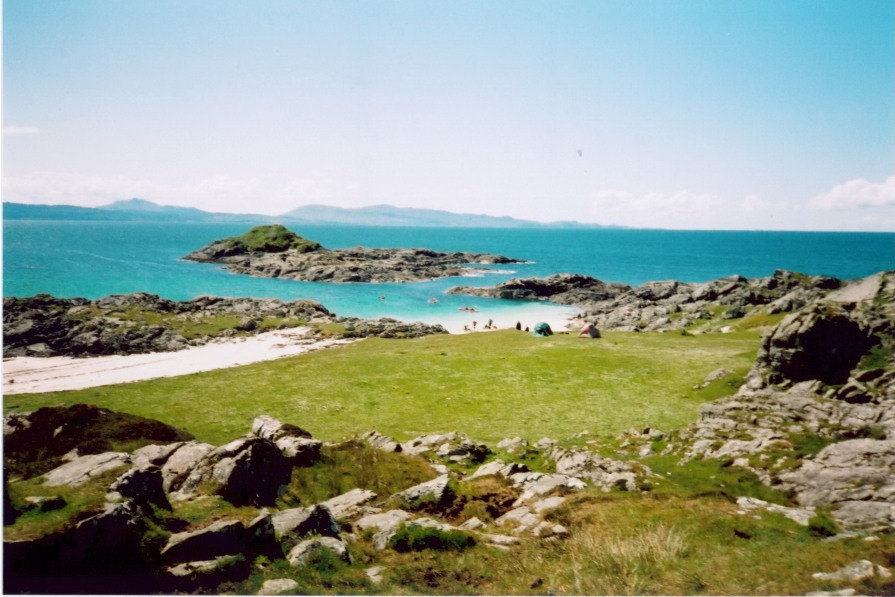
Port nam Murrach beach and duneland at the extreme west end of the peninsula. Looking westwards towards Eigg.

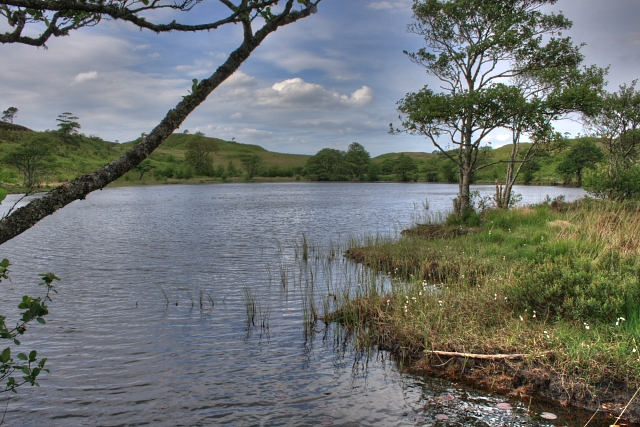
Loch a' Mhuilinn, a small lochan in the middle of the peninsula

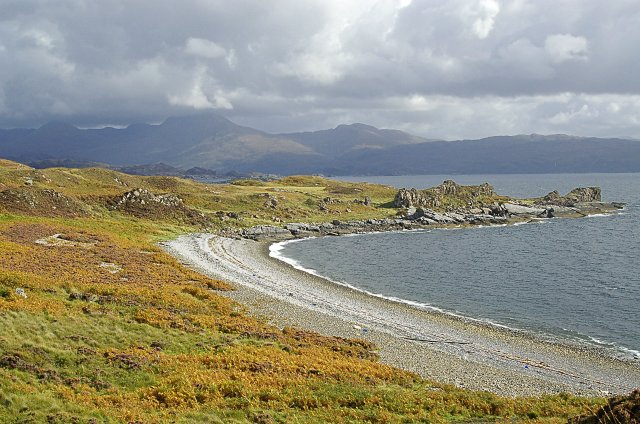
The bay of Camas Leathann from the west

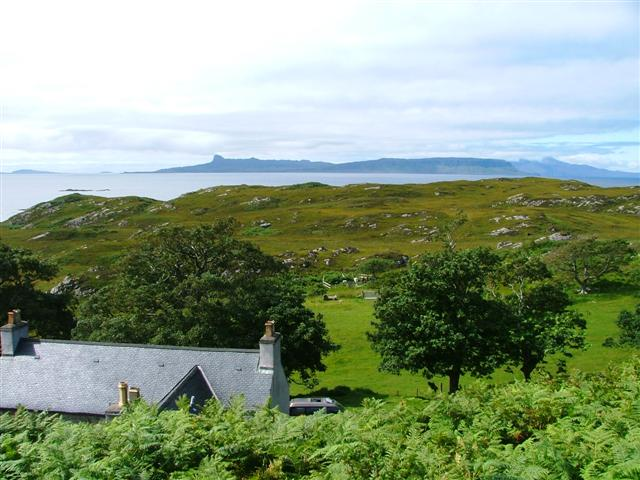
Rhue House looking westwards towards Eigg

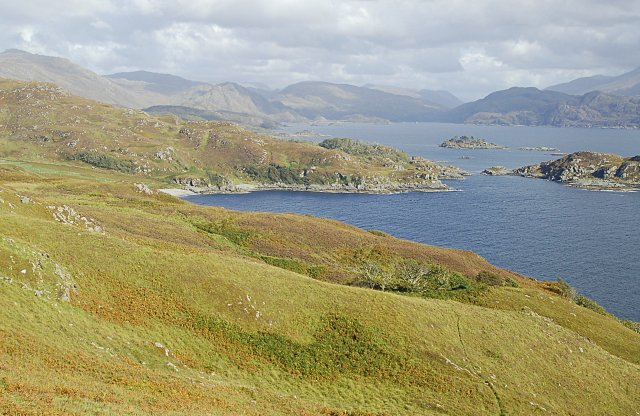
Camus Ghaoideil: Looking east from the slopes of Doire Fhada towards Ghaoideil and Loch Nan Uamh

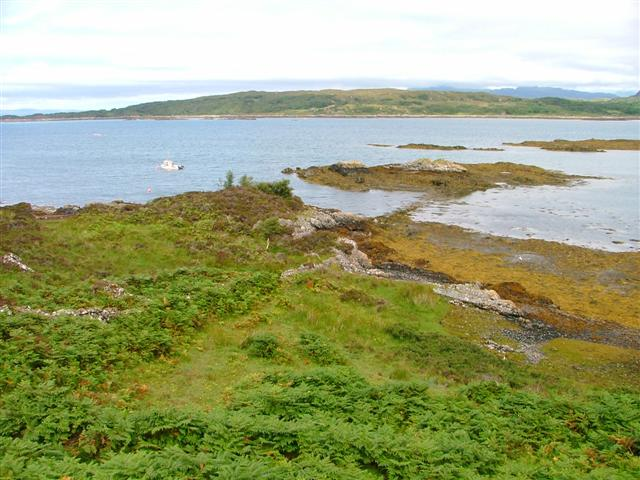
Loch nan Ceall on the north coast of the peninsula
