= Siuraarjuk =

Peninsula in Nunavut, Canada

Siuraarjuk ᓯᐅᕌᕐᔪᒃ (Inuktitut)
- Peninsula
- Coordinates: 69°56′52″N 81°23′11″W
- Location: Qikiqtaaluk Region, Nunavut, Canada
- Topo map: NTS 47D15 Cape Griffith

Siuraarjuk (Inuktitut syllabics: ᓯᐅᕌᕐᔪᒃ) formerly Siorarsuk Peninsula is a finger-shaped peninsula in northern Baffin Island in the Qikiqtaaluk Region of Nunavut, Canada. It juts into the Foxe Basin north of the Melville Peninsula. The island of Kapuiviit is 2.5 km (1.6 mi) southeast of it, separated by the South Passage.

Bowhead whales are known to congregate in the area until western Igloolik is ice-free, at which time they travel to that region.
