= Calvert Peninsula =

Peninsula in Maryland, U.S.

Coordinates: 38.549°N 76.589°W

Calvert Peninsula, Maryland

The Calvert Peninsula is part of the Western Shore region of the U.S. state of Maryland. It extends about 25 miles (40 km) into Chesapeake Bay with the main bay providing its eastern border and the Patuxent River defining its western border. It constitutes a total land area of about 350 square miles (910 km^{2}) and is essentially conterminous with Calvert County.

Immediately south of the Calvert Peninsula is the larger St. Mary's Peninsula, defined by the Patuxent and Potomac Rivers. Calvert Peninsula is connected to St. Mary's Peninsula by the Governor Thomas Johnson Bridge.

== Geology ==
The landmass of the peninsula was once covered by a warm shallow sea, 10 to 20 million years ago. Today, the geography of peninsula is continually reforming due to erosion.

== History ==
Captain John Smith first explored the cliffs along the peninsula in 1607 and 1608. Today the site is commemorated by the Calvert Cliffs State Park. In 1975, energy generation on the peninsula began with the opening of the Calvert Cliffs Nuclear Power Plant.

== See also ==
- Delmarva Peninsula
