= Sandakan Peninsula =

Peninsula in Sabah, Malaysia

- Location of Sandakan Peninsula in Sabah
- Location of Sandakan Peninsula in Malaysia
- Etymology: Semenanjung Sandakan

Geography
- Location: Sandakan Division
- Coordinates: 5°54′24.583″N 117°58′33.498″E
- Archipelago: Maritime Southeast Asia
- Adjacent to: Sulu Sea

Administration
- Malaysia
- State: Sabah

The Sandakan Peninsula (Malay: Semenanjung Sandakan) is a peninsula in Sandakan District, Sabah, Malaysia. It consists of broad coastal and forested areas.

== Geology ==
The tectonic of the peninsula started from Oligocene to Early Miocene, followed by deformation from Early Miocene to Middle Miocene that resulted in the opening of Sulu Sea and widening of Sandakan Basin. The rifting stopped in Late Miocene to early Pliocene which caused a major uplift around the Sandakan Peninsula with heavy erosion. The Upper Miocene formation dominates the eastern area of the peninsula with two main lithologies of sandstone and mudstone.

== Climate and biodiversity ==
The western part of the peninsula received mean annual rainfall ranging from 3,000 millimetres to 3,500 millimetres while the eastern part including Sandakan town received between 2,500 millimetres to 3,000 millimetres. In the peninsula located the Kabili-Sepilok Forest Reserve which is a type of lowlands of eastern Sabah with over 90 species of mammals and 200 species of birds have been recorded inhabiting the area.
