= St. Mary's Peninsula =

Area of Maryland

Coordinates: 38°16′N 76°33′W

St. Mary's Peninsula, at the southern tip of Maryland's Western Shore

St. Mary's Peninsula is part of the Western Shore region of Maryland. From the Charles County line, just north of Charlotte Hall, Maryland, to the southern tip of St. Mary's County at Point Lookout State Park, St. Mary's Peninsula stretches about 39 miles (63 km). It is bordered on the southwest by the Potomac River, on the north and east by the Patuxent River and on the east by Chesapeake Bay. From the end of these two rivers, the peninsula has about 15 miles of shoreline along the Bay's western shore from Lexington Park, Maryland to Point Lookout. Its shoreline stretches for a total of 536 miles along the Patuxent River, Potomac River and the Chesapeake Bay.

Conterminous with the boundaries of St. Mary's County, the peninsula covers a land area of 361.25 square miles (935.6 km^{2}).

Northeast of St. Mary's Peninsula, on the opposite side of the Patuxent River, is the smaller Calvert Peninsula. Like St. Mary's Peninsula, Calvert Peninsula also has boundaries conterminous with a single Maryland county.

== Ecology ==
St. Mary's Peninsula is largely defined ecologically by the Chesapeake Bay and its tributary rivers, which are also tidal. There are also some freshwater streams and a few runs of freshwater rivers above tidal zones. It also has many freshwater ponds and lakes.

Its land is characterized by forests, farms and developed areas; many clay-rich hills, waterfront cliffs and ridges, and also many estuarine brackish water lowland marsh areas with extensive creeks and coves as well. It is home to whitetail deer, coyotes and many other typical Eastern woodland animal and plant species. Its forests are a mixture of deciduous trees and pine typical of the Mid-Atlantic region of the Eastern seaboard of the United States.

The waters of the Chesapeake Bay and its tributaries have been considered to be one of the most diverse and productive estuaries in the world but have, in recent decades, come under tremendous stress from overfishing, shoreline development and pollution.

== Climate ==
Temperatures on the peninsula range from an average of 37.4 °F (3.0 °C) in the winter to a summer average of 74.4 °F (23.6 °C). Precipitation averages 47.5 inches (121 cm) of rain and 17.8 inches (45 cm) inches of snow annually.

Due to its often hot and humid summers, St. Mary's county lies within the humid subtropical climate zone of North America's lower east coast states, surrounded on three sides by bodies of water, including the Potomac River, the Patuxent River and the Chesapeake Bay. Afternoon thunderstorms are frequent throughout the summer. Winters are on average cool to mild but with intervening periods of much more intense cold, and with occasional blizzards more characteristic of northern regions. St. Mary's has ample rainfall as well. Average annual low temperatures place St. Mary's Peninsula in the 7a and 7b USDA hardiness zones covering most of Maryland, ranging from 0 to 10 degrees F. Temperatures measured over 86 degree F for 15 to 30 days during the summer rate the peninsula in the American Horticultural Society's heat zone 4.

Small tornadoes sometimes touch down on the peninsula, but major damage is uncommon. On rare occasions there have been larger, more destructive tornadoes. The area is prone to tropical storms during a relatively short hurricane season, especially in late August and September, which bring high winds and torrential rains. Since 1980, there have been no direct hits from hurricanes, but the area has been hammered by several nearby passages along the coast, and the remnants of hurricanes. The deadliest of these was Hurricane Sandy, which killed 11 people in Maryland in 2012; most destructive was Hurricane Irene in 2011. (See List of Maryland hurricanes.) St. Mary's has many waterfront bluffs, cliffs, hills and ridges that protect much of the peninsula, with elevations climbing as high as 192 feet (59 m), but low-lying areas near the shore are vulnerable to storm surges.

== Administration ==
For political purposes, including management of resources, St. Mary's Peninsula matches exactly the same area as St. Mary's County, Maryland. It is also a part of the State of Maryland in the United States of America.

== History ==
Archeological evidence shows that St. Mary's has had human habitation for more than 10,000 years. The Piscatway Indian Nation was already present on the Peninsula when European settlers first arrived. The nation now has three distinct branches, all of which have descendants still living in the county and one of these branches also has its headquarters in the county.

The St. Mary's Peninsula was the site of the first Maryland Colony and was the fourth permanent colonial settlement in North America. Consequently, its history from that perspective goes back more than 380 years to the 1630s. Many of the descendants of this period, and also descendants of later immigrants to the area as well as former slave populations from the antebellum period also still live on the peninsula.

A large military base, Patuxent River Naval Air Station and a major College, St. Mary's College of Maryland, also have added residents to the area in the last 50 years. The Northern area of the peninsula is also rapidly developing as an outer suburb for Washington D.C. commuters.

== See also ==
- St. Mary's City, Maryland
- St. Mary's County
