= Turner's Peninsula =

Coordinates: 7°22′48″N 12°24′20″W

Turner's Peninsula is a 110 km-long peninsula in southern Sierra Leone, running westwards, parallel to the coast, bounded by the Atlantic Ocean. The peninsula was occupied by the British from 1825 and is inhabited along all of its length.

Home to Lake Kenema and sourced at Lake Mape and the Waanje River.
