= Kapuiviit =

Uninhabited island in the Arctic Archipelago

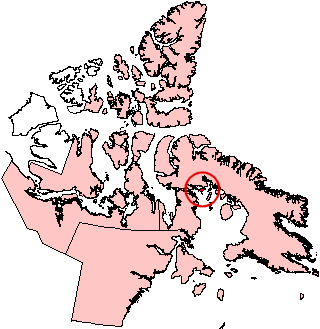
- Location in Nunavut

- Location within Nunavut Location within Canada

Geography
- Location: Foxe Basin
- Coordinates: 69°41′19″N 80°00′32″W
- Archipelago: Arctic Archipelago
- Area: 920 km^{2} (360 sq mi)

Administration
- Canada
- Nunavut: Nunavut
- Region: Qikiqtaaluk

Demographics
- Population: Uninhabited

Kapuiviit (Inuktitut syllabics: ᑲᐳᐃᕖᑦ), formerly Jens Munk Island, is one of the Canadian arctic islands in the Qikiqtaaluk Region, Nunavut, Canada. It is an uninhabited Baffin Island offshore island with an area of 920 km^{2} (360 sq mi).

The island presently has no permanent resident population (since displacements driven by colonialism took place in the 1950s and 1960s) but it remains an important outpost camp in the Igloolik Island area. Historically, however, it was the location of Kapuivik, a hunting camp which is now an important archaeological site for the research of pre-Inuit peoples including the Dorset (Tuniit), Pre-Dorset and Paleo-Inuit. It was formerly named after Dano-Norwegian explorer Jens Munk.

Kapuivik was also the birthplace of noted film director Zacharias Kunuk.
